= GEO-4 =

GEO-4 may refer to:

- the fourth in a series of Global Environment Outlook reports issued in 2007 by the United Nations Environmental Program
- SBIRS-GEO 4, the fourth in a series of geosynchronous orbit space surveillance satellites launched as part of the United States Air Force's Space-Based Infrared System
