= USA-282 =

United States military satellite

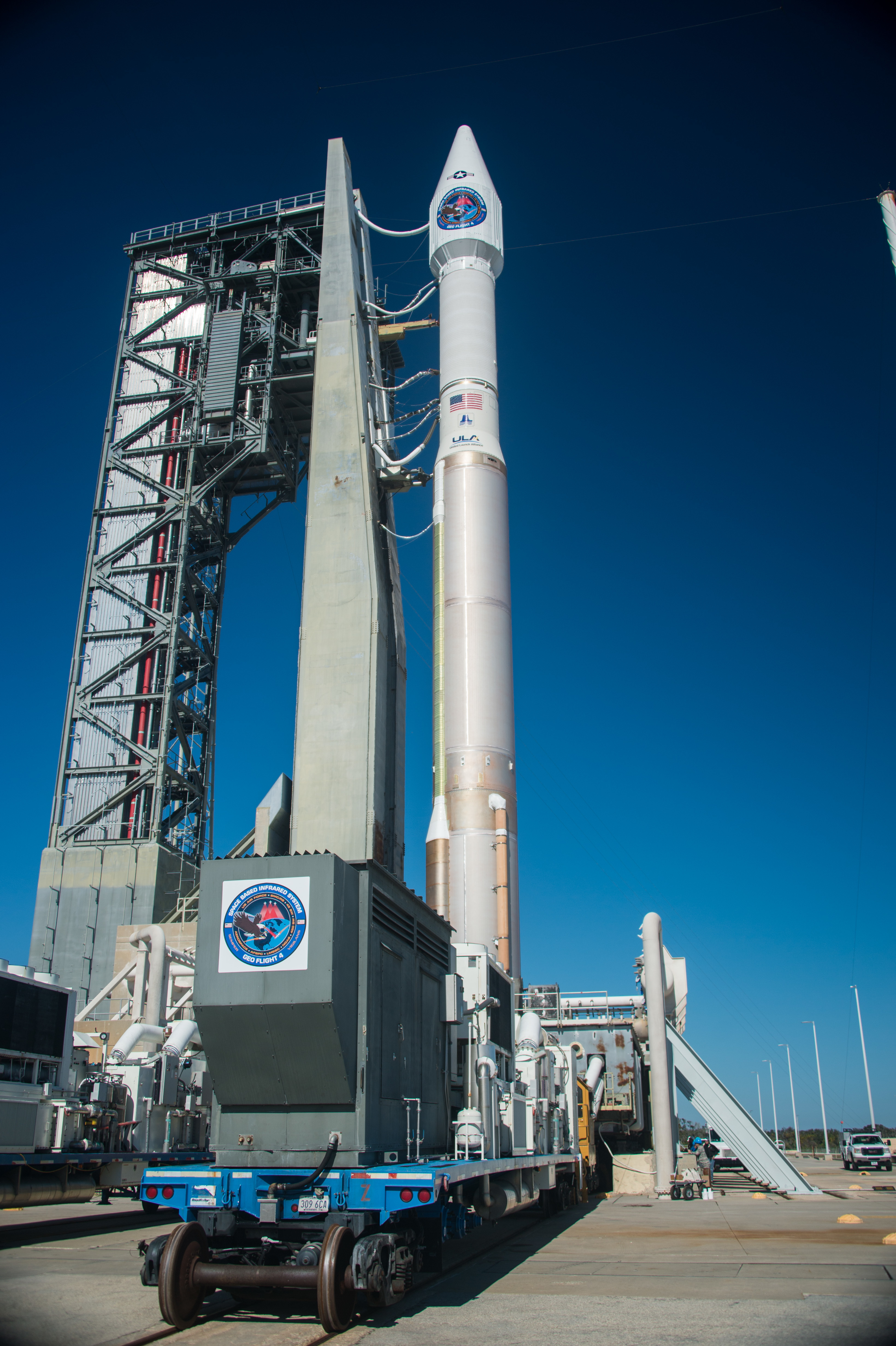
- SBIRS GEO-4 satellite on the pad
- Names: SBIRS GEO-4 (SV-3); Space-Based Infrared System GEOstationary-4
- Mission type: Infrared early warning IRINT
- Operator: United States Air Force / United States Space Force
- COSPAR ID: 2018-009A
- SATCAT no.: 43162
- Website: https://www.spaceforce.mil/
- Mission duration: 12 years (planned); 8 years, 2 months and 6 days (in progress)

Spacecraft properties
- Spacecraft: SBIRS GEO-4
- Spacecraft type: SBIRS GEO
- Bus: A2100M
- Manufacturer: Lockheed Martin Space
- Launch mass: 4,500 kg (9,900 lb)
- Dimensions: 15 m x 6.7 m x 6.1 m

Start of mission
- Launch date: 20 January 2018, 00:48 UTC
- Rocket: Atlas V 411 (AV-076)
- Launch site: Cape Canaveral (CCAFS), SLC-41
- Contractor: United Launch Alliance (ULA)

Orbital parameters
- Reference system: Geocentric orbit
- Regime: Geostationary orbit

Instruments
- 2 SBIRS infrared sensors

USA-282, also known as SBIRS GEO-4, is a United States military satellite and part of the Space-Based Infrared System.

== Overview ==
The SBIRS program was designed to provide a seamless operational transition from DSP to SBIRS and meet jointly defined requirements of the defense and intelligence communities in support of the missile early warning, missile defense, battlespace awareness and technical intelligence mission areas.

The SBIRS satellites are a replacement for the Defense Support Program (DSP) early warning system. They are intended to detect ballistic missile launches, as well as various other events in the infrared spectrum, including nuclear explosions, aircraft flights, space object entries and reentries, wildfires and spacecraft launches.

== Satellite description ==
SBIRS GEO-4 was manufactured by Lockheed Martin Space, at production facility in Sunnyvale, California, and is built upon the A2100M satellite bus. The Atlas V launch vehicle used for SBIRS GEO-4 flew with a strap-on booster, a different configuration from the previous three SBIRS GEO launches. This was done as part of a space debris mitigation effort, to allow the Centaur upper stage to preserve sufficient fuel for a deorbit burn.

== Launch ==
SBIRS GEO-4 was the third geostationary SBIRS satellite to be built, Satellite Vehicle 3 (SV-3). Construction of the satellite was completed before it was required to launch, so the spacecraft was placed into storage. The U.S. Air Force later opted to launch Satellite Vehicle 4 (SV-4) first as SBIRS GEO-3, saving the cost of putting the newly completed SV-4 into storage and additional testing that would be needed upon taking it back out.

The Atlas V, with the tail number AV-076, flew in its 411 configuration. This Atlas V configuration differs from the 401 version used for the previous three SBIRS GEO launches – which did not use any solid rocket booster (SRB). The change of configuration has ostensibly been made to ensure Centaur can be deorbited after satellite separation, helping to mitigate space debris. On previous SBIRS GEO launches, Centaur has remained in a disposal orbit, close to geostationary transfer orbit (GTO), at the end of its mission.

It was launched on 20 January 2018 from Cape Canaveral (CCAFS), atop an Atlas V 411 launch vehicle.

== Mission ==
The U.S. Air Force announced the satellite was operating as expected and had established initial communications with it.
