= USA-230 =

United States military satellite

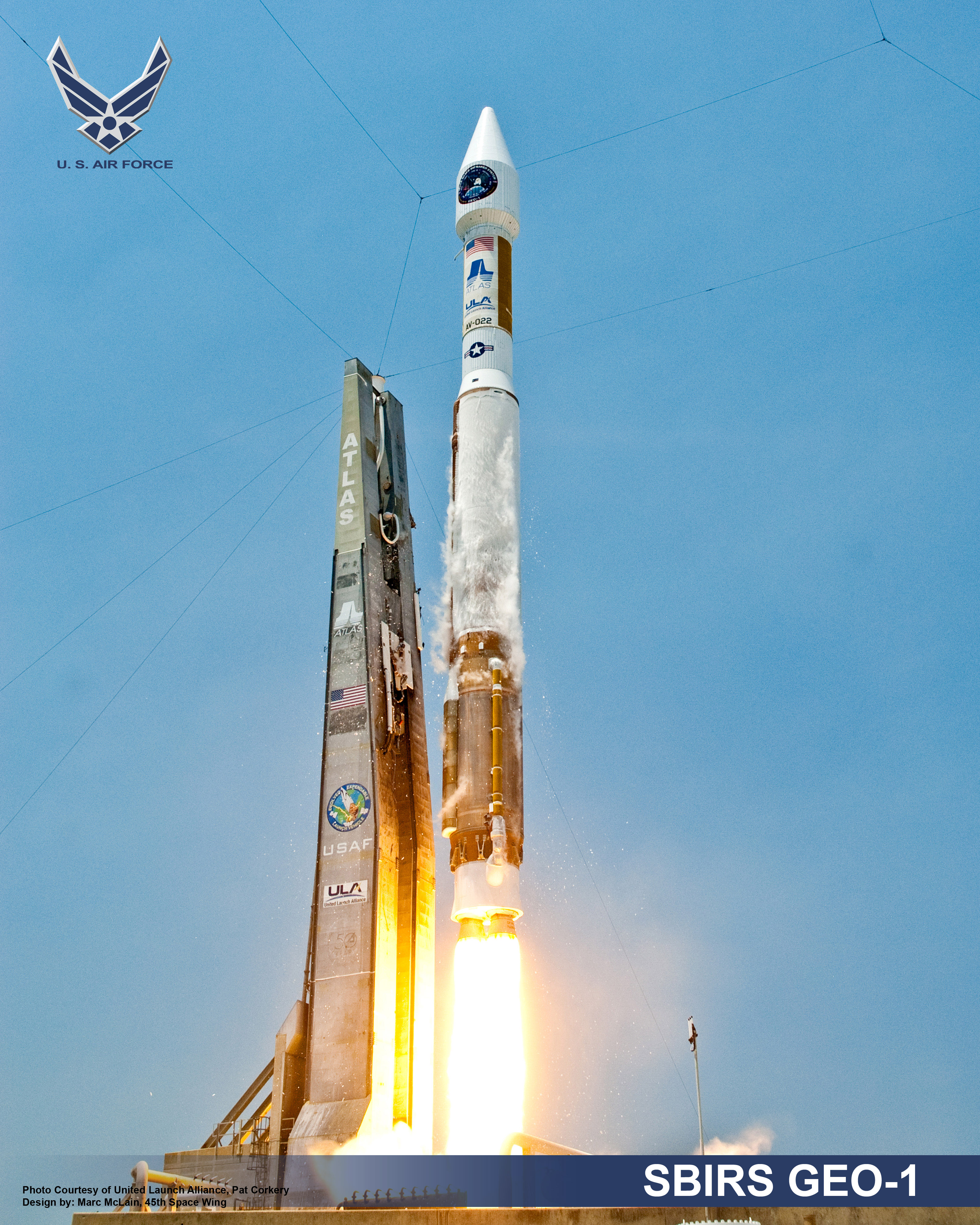
- USA-230 launched by an Atlas V.
- Names: SBIRS GEO-1 (SV-1); Space-Based Infrared System GEOstationary-1
- Mission type: Infrared early warning IRINT
- Operator: United States Air Force / United States Space Force
- COSPAR ID: 2011-019A
- SATCAT no.: 37481
- Website: https://www.spaceforce.mil/
- Mission duration: 12 years (planned); 14 years, 10 months and 17 days (in progress)

Spacecraft properties
- Spacecraft: SBIRS GEO-1
- Spacecraft type: SBIRS GEO
- Bus: A2100M
- Manufacturer: Lockheed Martin Space
- Launch mass: 4,500 kg (9,900 lb)
- Dimensions: 15 m x 6.7 m x 6.1 m

Start of mission
- Launch date: 7 May 2011, 18:10 UTC
- Rocket: Atlas V 401 (AV-022)
- Launch site: Cape Canaveral, SLC-41
- Contractor: United Launch Alliance

Orbital parameters
- Reference system: Geocentric orbit
- Regime: Geostationary orbit

USA-230, also known as SBIRS GEO-1, is a United States military satellite and part of the Space-Based Infrared System.

== Overview ==
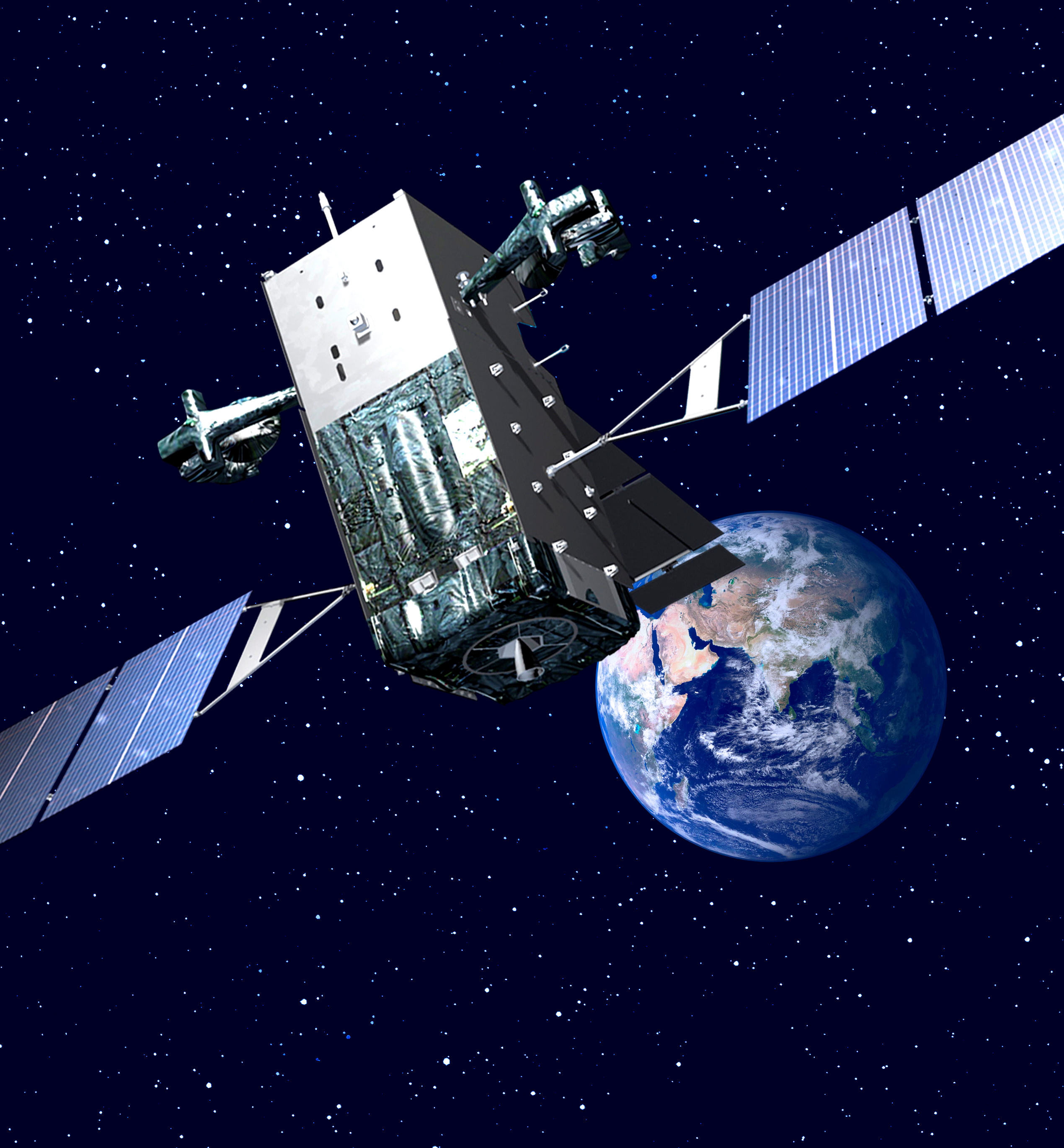
SBIRS GEO-1 in orbit

In the mid 1950s, the United States began development of the first space-based missile detection system; the Missile Defense Alarm System (MIDAS), in low Earth orbit. Following the end of the MIDAS programme, plans to deploy an operational system led to the Integrated Missile Early Warning Satellite programme (IMEWS), followed by the Defense Support Program (DSP),

The SBIRS satellites are a replacement for the Defense Support Program early warning system. They are intended to detect ballistic missile launches, as well as various other events in the infrared spectrum, including nuclear explosions, aircraft flights, space object entries and reentries, wildfires and spacecraft launches.

== Satellite description ==
SBIRS-GEO 1 was manufactured by Lockheed Martin Space and is built upon the A2100M satellite bus.

== Launch ==
SBIRS GEO-1 was launched on 7 May 2011 from Cape Canaveral (CCAFS), atop an Atlas V 401 (AV-022) launch vehicle.
