= USA-241 =

United States military satellite

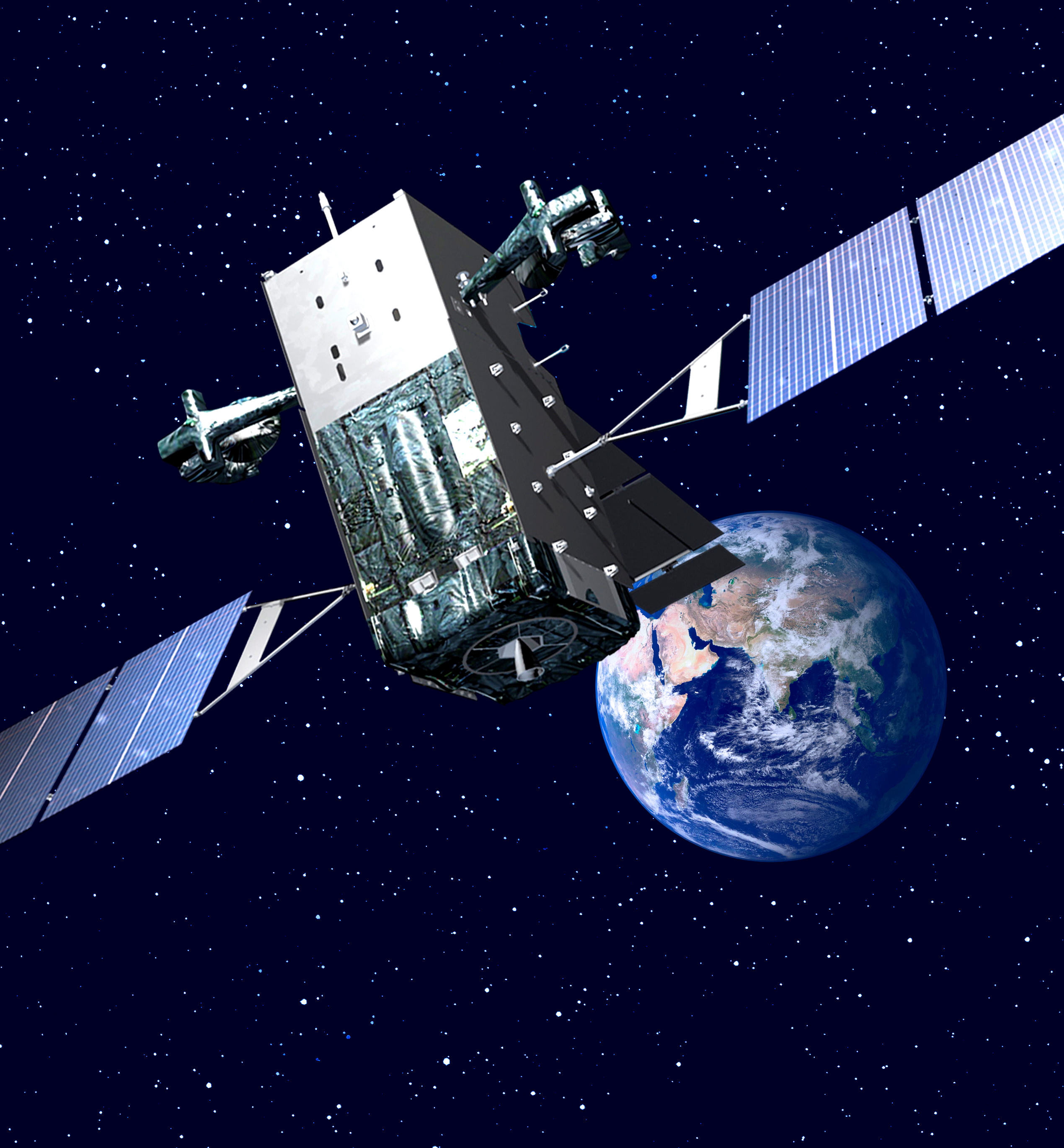
- SBIRS GEO-2 satellite in orbit
- Names: SBIRS GEO-2 (SV-2); Space-Based Infrared System GEOstationary-2
- Mission type: Infrared early warning IRINT
- Operator: United States Air Force / United States Space Force
- COSPAR ID: 2013-011A
- SATCAT no.: 39120
- Website: https://www.spaceforce.mil/
- Mission duration: 12 years (planned); 13 years and 5 days (in progress)

Spacecraft properties
- Spacecraft: SBIRS GEO-2
- Spacecraft type: SBIRS GEO
- Bus: A2100M
- Manufacturer: Lockheed Martin Space
- Launch mass: 4,500 kg (9,900 lb)
- Dimensions: 15 m x 6.7 m x 6.1 m

Start of mission
- Launch date: 19 March 2013, 21:21:00 UTC
- Rocket: Atlas V 401 (AV-037)
- Launch site: Cape Canaveral, SLC-41
- Contractor: United Launch Alliance
- Entered service: October 2013

Orbital parameters
- Reference system: Geocentric orbit
- Regime: Geostationary orbit

USA-241, also known as SBIRS GEO-2, is a United States military satellite and part of the Space-Based Infrared System.

== Overview ==
The SBIRS satellites are a replacement for the Defense Support Program early warning system. They are intended to detect ballistic missile launches, as well as various other events in the infrared spectrum, including nuclear explosions, aircraft flights, space object entries and reentries, wildfires and spacecraft launches.

== Satellite description ==
SBIRS-GEO 2 was manufactured by Lockheed Martin Space and is built upon the A2100M satellite bus.

== Launch ==
SBIRS GEO-2 was launched on 19 March 2013 from Cape Canaveral, atop an Atlas V launch vehicle.

== Mission ==
In October 2013, the satellite was incorporated into the United States early warning network.
