= USA-315 =

US Space Force geostationary satellite

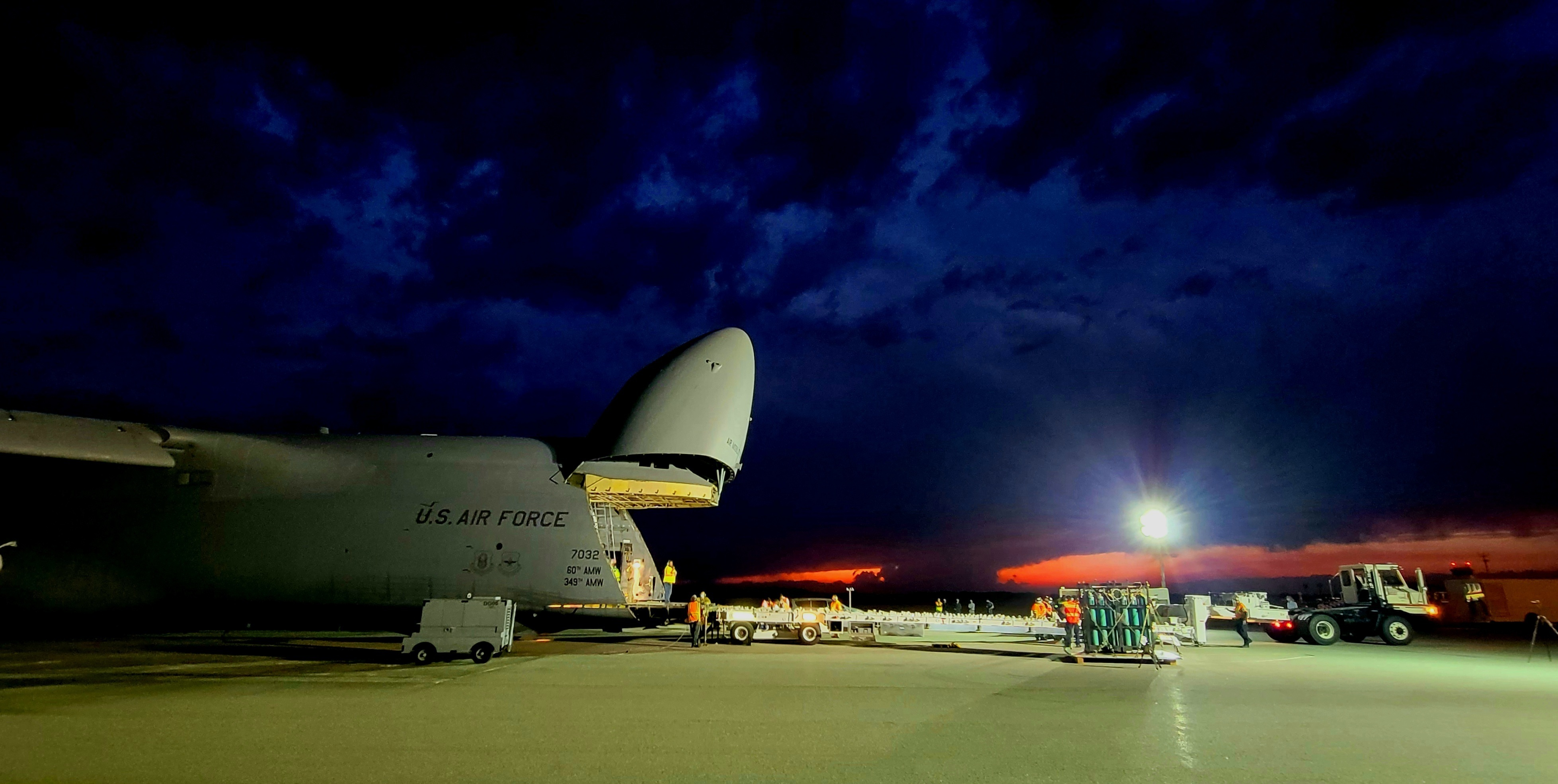
- Offloading of SBIRS-GEO 5 Satellite
- Names: USA-315; SBIRS GEO-5
- Mission type: Early Warning; IRINT
- Operator: United States Space Force
- COSPAR ID: 2021-042A
- SATCAT no.: 48618

Spacecraft properties
- Manufacturer: Lockheed Martin
- Launch mass: 4,500 kg (9,900 lb)
- Power: 2 deployable solar arrays, batteries

Start of mission
- Launch date: 18 May 2021
- Rocket: Atlas V 421 (AV-091)
- Launch site: Cape Canaveral Space Force Station, Florida
- Contractor: United Launch Alliance

Orbital parameters
- Regime: Geostationary

USA-315, also known as SBIRS GEO-5, is a military satellite developed as a part of the Space-Based Infrared System. The satellite aims to increase the capabilities of the United States Department of Defense in terms of missile defense and military intelligence.

== Overview ==
As a part of the SBIRS program, the successor of Defense Support Program (DSP), new satellites with better features were planned to be launched and used by United States Air Force and Space Force. USA-315, like other satellites in SBIRS program, is used for early warning.

The initial work contract for SBIRS GEO-5 and SBIRS GEO-6 was awarded to Lockheed Martin in October 2012. After two years, Lockheed Martin was awarded again in 2014, but this time with a manufacturing contract.

SBIRS GEO-5 is built on an LM 2100 Combat Bus and the development phase took more than five years.

On 18 May 2021, SBIRS GEO-5 (USA-315) was launched from Cape Canaveral Space Force Station, Florida.

The satellite was accepted by the U.S. Space Force and showed %40 improvement in average testing times.
