= Space Tracking and Surveillance System =

Part of an American national defense system against ballistic missile attack

STSS-Demo
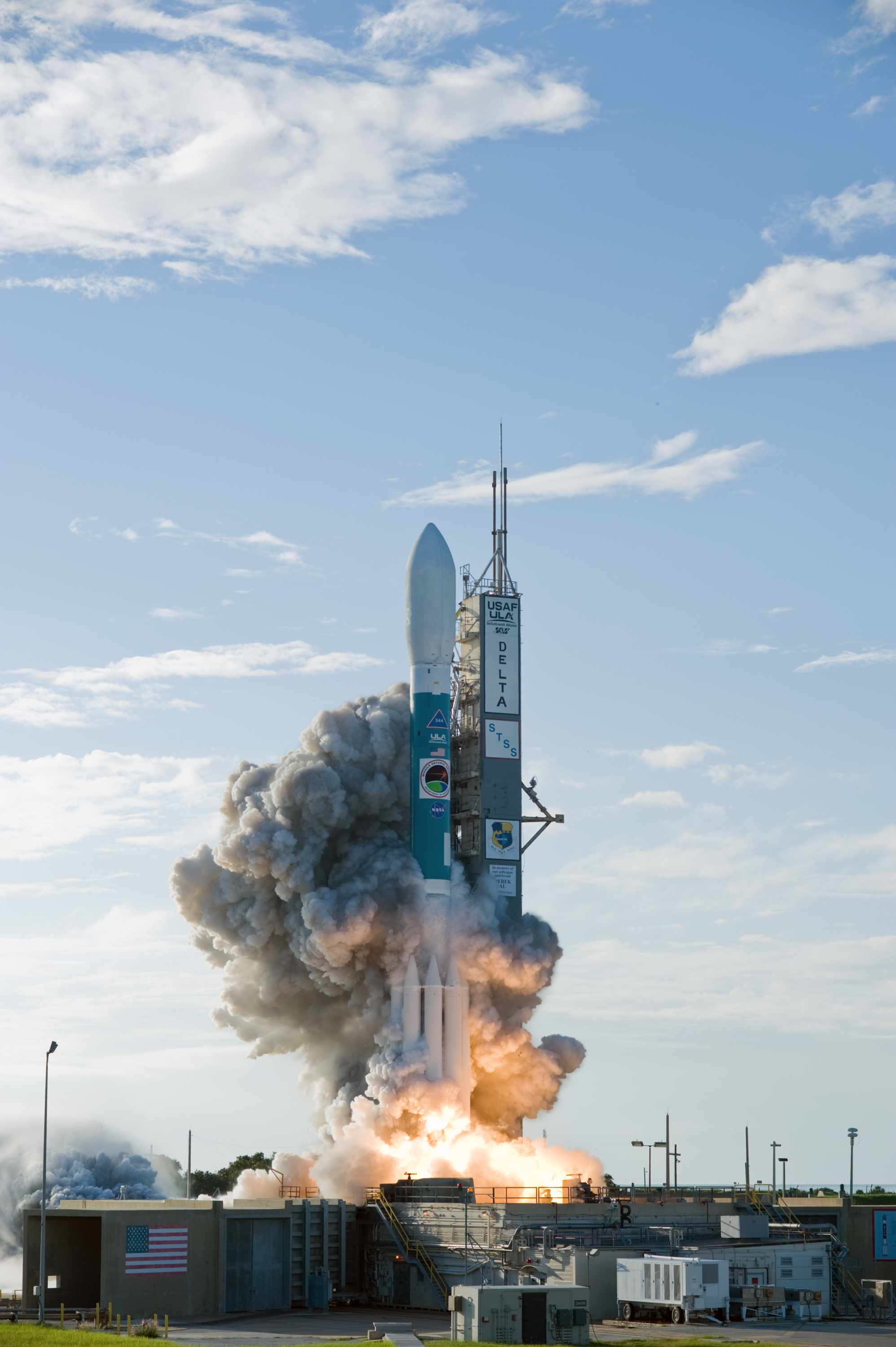
- Launch of STSS-Demo Mission
- Names: SBIR-Low; STSS-1; STSS-2; USA-208; USA-209
- Mission type: Tracking and Surveillance
- Operator: U.S. Missile Defense Agency
- COSPAR ID: 2009-052A / 2009-052B
- SATCAT no.: 35937 / 35938
- Mission duration: Planned: 2 years Final: 12 years, 2 months

Spacecraft properties
- Spacecraft: STSS
- Spacecraft type: STSS demonstrator satellite
- Manufacturer: Northrop Grumman Space Technology

Start of mission
- Launch date: 25 September 2009, 12:20:00 UTC
- Rocket: Delta II 7920-10C (Delta D344)
- Launch site: Cape Canaveral, LC-17B
- Contractor: United Launch Alliance
- Entered service: Late January 2010

End of mission
- Deactivated: 8 March 2022

Orbital parameters
- Reference system: Geocentric orbit
- Regime: Low Earth orbit
- Altitude: 1,350 km (840 mi)
- Inclination: 58.0°
- Period: 120.0 minutes

The Space Tracking and Surveillance System (STSS; formerly SBIRS-Low) was a pair of satellites developed by the United States Missile Defense Agency (MDA) to research the space-based detection and tracking of ballistic missiles. Data from STSS satellites could allow interceptors to engage incoming missiles earlier in flight than would be possible with other missile detection systems. The STSS program began in 2001, when the "SBIRS Low" program was transferred to MDA from the United States Air Force. In December 2002, SBIRS Low Research & Development (SBIRS Low R&D) was renamed Space Tracking and Surveillance System (STSS).

== Launch ==
One of the two satellites had been shipped to Cape Canaveral (CCAFS) on 4 May 2009; the second satellite arrived at the launch site on 25 June 2009.

Two demonstration satellites were launched together on a single Delta II launch vehicle. Launch took place 25 September 2009, from Cape Canaveral Space Launch Complex 17 (LC-17B). STSS constellation consists of two satellites orbiting at 1350 km, 58.0° inclination, with 120 minute period.

It was reported that several items of debris, identified by amateur satellite watchers as remnants of the Delta-2 launch vehicle, had crashed in a field in Mongolia on 19 February 2010.

== Early detection ==
The perceived advantage of STSS was that its satellites, by operating at a lower altitude and by using long- and short-wave infrared sensors, would be able to acquire and track missiles in midcourse and during the boost phase.

== The role of STSS ==
STSS was designed to be the low Earth orbiter (LEO) within the layered Ballistic Missile Defense System. It complemented the geosynchronous Defense Support Program, the Space-Based Infrared System, and other overhead non-imaging infrared (ONIR) systems and provided tracking cues to systems on the surface. The STSS program was developed in phases, the first of which was the launch of two demonstrator satellites. The demonstrators performed experiments and proved out systems and processes to establish a knowledge base for future operational designs. The demonstration satellites, built by Northrop Grumman Space Technology (spacecraft) and Raytheon Technologies (sensors) detected and tracked a two-stage Ground-Based Interceptor (GBI) during a U.S. Missile Defense Agency flight test on 6 June 2010.

== Congressional testimony ==
According to Congressional testimony, military officials believed that STSS had the potential to bolster the nation's missile defense system. "Two recent flight tests demonstrated that STSS dramatically improved the precision of threat missile attacks and provided more accurate fire control quality data to the Aegis ships several minutes earlier than less accurate data provided by organic radars in the Aegis or THAAD (Theater High Altitude Area Defense) systems", U.S. Army Lt. General Patrick J. O'Reilly, Director of the U.S. Missile Defense Agency, told the U.S. Senate Appropriations Committee's Defense subcommittee in prepared testimony on 25 May 2011.

== Timeline of STSS missile tracking tests ==
According to Globe Newswire (sourced by Northrop Grumman) press releases, the following is a summary of the STSS Demonstration program satellites' on-orbit performance.

June 2010

- 6 June 2010 at 22:25 UTC

Ground-Based Interceptor test launched from Vandenberg Air Force Base.

First STSS Object Sighting Messages (OSM) of a missile
First on-board missile track formed.

- 16 June 2010 at 10:01 UTC

ICBM Minuteman III test launched from Vandenberg Air Force Base
Pre-determined target launched of Ronald Reagan Ballistic Missile Defense Test Site at Kwajalein Atoll, Marshall Islands
Data transmitted at Missile Defense Integration and Operations Center (MDIOC) at Schriever Air Force Base, Colorado.

First dual satellite collect of target, and
First target acquisition from a target launched beyond the horizon.

- 29 June 2010 at 07:32 UTC

Scud missile was launched from a Mobile Launch Platform (formerly USS Tripoli) near of Kauai, Hawaii
Terminal High Altitude Area Defense (THAAD) missile launched from Vandenberg Air Force Base.

First OSMs sent to Enterprise Sensors Laboratory at Schriever Air Force Base, Colorado, for data fusion with other sensors in real time
First track of a dim theater missile.

July 2010

- 19 July 2010

First track of a resident space object.

Tracked a NOAA weather satellite on 19 July 2010 for several minutes (externally queued)

- 23 July 2010

First autonomous acquisition sensor to track sensor handover of a target.

Hand-off demonstration occurred when STSS acquired a ground laser source operated by U.S. Air Force Research Laboratory from the Starfire Optical Range at Kirtland Air Force Base, New Mexico.

August 2010

- 5 August 2010

First track of an aircraft

Precision track sensor operation below the horizon during daylight
First autonomous acquisition sensor to track sensor handover of an aircraft

September 2010

- 1 September 2010

Airborne Laser Test Bed Exercise

First autonomous acquisition sensor to track sensor handover of a boosted target

- 17 September 2020 at 10:02 UTC

ICBM Minuteman III test launched from Vandenberg Air Force Base to Island of Guam (8500 km).

First post boost track continuation of a target with track sensor
First demonstration of track sensor generating multiple tracks for separating objects.

October 2010

- 5 October 2010

Aegis Launch on Remote Campaign
First Track sensor stereo track of a dim boosted target
First stereo post boost tracking of midcourse target.

March 2011

- 9 March 2011

Second Aegis Readiness Assessment Vehicle Targeting
STSS satellites acquired and tracked its target until re-entry

- 15 March 2011

Second full-course tracking during U.S. Missile Defense Agency's (MDA) Aegis launch
Successful production of "stereo" 3-D tracking software to follow the target missile's flight path to predict its impact point.

April 2011

- 15 April 2011

Sea-based missile defense test

STSS satellites target and help to intercept an intermediate-range ballistic missile (IRBM); destruction of the IRBM on impact.

July 2011

- 8 July 2011

STSS test on short-range air-launched target (SRALT)

This test proved the STSS's ability to track dim objects that have extremely short flight timelines.

== End of mission ==
The two Space Tracking and Surveillance System satellites stopped collecting data in September 2021. After being moved to higher orbits to prevent future collisions with other space objects, the two satellites were decommissioned on 8 March 2022.

== See also ==
- Aegis Ballistic Missile Defense System
- Defense Support Program
- Ground-Based Midcourse Defense
- USA 205
