= GEO-1 =

GEO-1 may refer to:

- the first in a series of Global Environment Outlook reports issued in 1997 by the United Nations Environmental Program
- Geosynchronous satellite USA-230, also known as SBIRS High GEO 1, the first in a series of space surveillance satellites launched in 2011 as part of the United States Air Force's Space-Based Infrared System
