= GEO-2 =

GEO-2 may refer to:

- the second in a series of Global Environment Outlook reports issued in 1999 by the United Nations Environmental Program (also known as GEO-2000)
- Geosynchronous satellite USA-241, also known as SBIRS GEO 2, the second in a series of space surveillance satellites launched on March 19, 2013, as part of the United States Air Force's Space-Based Infrared System
