= USA-336 =

US Space Force geostationary satellite

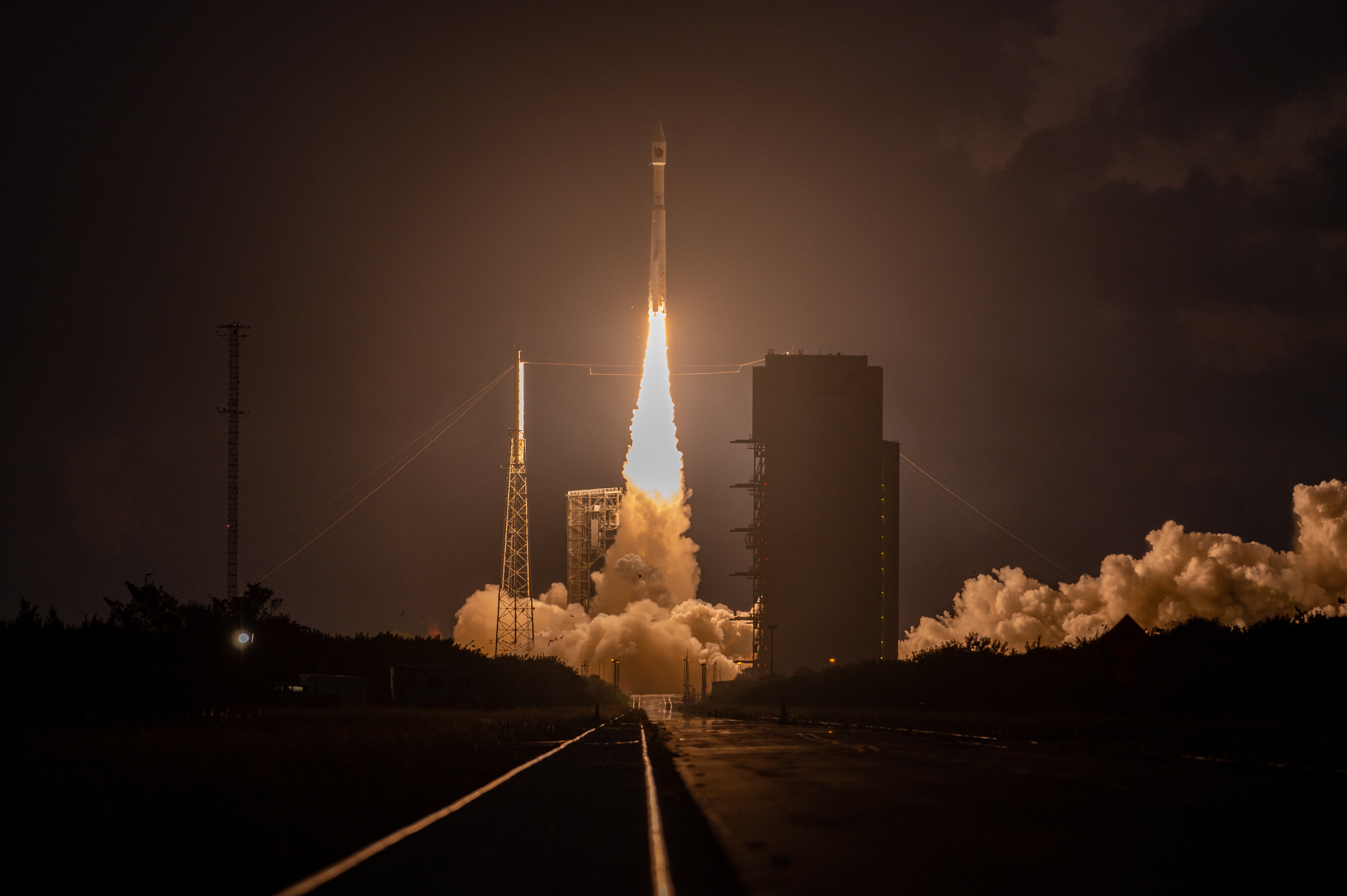
- The launch of Atlas V 421, the rocket that carried USA-336
- Names: USA-336; SBIRS-GEO 6
- Mission type: Early Warning
- Operator: United States Air Force / United States Space Force
- COSPAR ID: 2022-092A

Spacecraft properties
- Manufacturer: Lockheed Martin
- Launch mass: 4,500 kg (9,900 lb)
- Power: 2 deployable solar arrays, batteries

Start of mission
- Launch date: August 4, 2022, 6:29 am EDT
- Rocket: Atlas V 421 (AV-097)
- Launch site: Cape Canaveral Space Force Station, Florida
- Contractor: United Launch Alliance

Orbital parameters
- Regime: Geostationary
- Longitude: 138.92°
- Altitude: 35,799 km (22,244 mi)
- Period: 23 hours 56 minutes
- Velocity: 3 km/s (1.9 mi/s)

USA-336, also known as SBIRS-GEO 6 (Space Based Infrared System - Geostationary 6), is a geostationary satellite operated by the United States Space Force (formerly operated by the United States Air Force). USA-336 forms part of the SBIRS High program. It is the last SBIRS Satellite to be launched and future mission will use new Next-Generation Overhead Persistent Infrared (NG-OPIR) Satellites.

== Overview ==
USA-336 is a three-axis stabilized satellite equipped with an Overhead Persistent Infrared (OPIR) scanner. USA-336 uses its OPIR scanner and long-range surveillance to provide early warning for Ballistic Missile launches. It will replace older Defense Support Program satellites.
