= Lockheed Martin Space =

Operating division of Lockheed Martin

Lockheed Martin Space is one of the four major business divisions of Lockheed Martin. It has its headquarters in Littleton, Colorado, with additional sites in Valley Forge, Pennsylvania; Sunnyvale, California; Santa Cruz, California; Huntsville, Alabama; and elsewhere in the United States and United Kingdom. The division employs about 20,000 people, and its products include commercial and military satellites, space probes, missile defense systems, NASA's Orion spacecraft, and the Space Shuttle external tank.

== History ==
The Lockheed Missile Systems Division was established in Van Nuys, California, in late 1953 to consolidate work on the Lockheed X-17 and X-7. The X-17 was a three-stage solid-fuel research rocket designed to test the effects of high mach atmospheric reentry. The X-17 was also used as the booster for the Operation Argus series of three high-altitude nuclear tests conducted in the South Atlantic in 1958. The Lockheed X-7 (dubbed the "Flying Stove Pipe") was an American uncrewed test bed of the 1950s for ramjet engines and missile guidance technology.

Lockheed Missiles Division moved from Van Nuys, California, to the newly constructed facility in Palo Alto, California, in 1956, then to the larger facility in Sunnyvale in 1957. The Polaris missile was the first major new program for both locations, followed later by satellite programs, thus the name change to Lockheed Missiles and Space Division.

The UGM-27 Polaris was a Submarine-launched ballistic missile (SLBM) built during the Cold War by Lockheed Missiles & Space Division in Sunnyvale, California, for the United States Navy. The Polaris program started development in 1956, with its first flight test in 1958. In 1962, the USS Ethan Allen (SSBN-608) successfully fired a Polaris A-1 missile against a test target in 1960. The SLBM has evolved through Polaris (A2), Polaris (A3), Poseidon (C3), Trident I (C4) and ongoing with the Trident II (D5). All of these were designed and managed at the Sunnyvale facility. Together, these are known as the Navy's Fleet Ballistic Missile (FBM) Program. Lockheed Martin has been the sole provider of FBM missiles since 1956.

Lockheed Missiles & Space became prime contractor for elements of Military Satellite System (WS 117L), calling for the development of a strategic satellite system. The core element was Lockheed's Agena spacecraft, the world's first multipurpose spacecraft with boost and maneuvering engines, also acting as the 2nd stage of the launch vehicle and/or carrier vehicle for the reconnaissance system. WS-117L and Agena lead to the development of the Corona (satellite)—the nation's first photo reconnaissance satellite system, collecting both intelligence and mapping imagery from August 1960 until May 1972. Over 800,000 images were taken from space, with imaging resolution originally equaling 8 metres (26 ft 3 in), later improved to 2 metres (6 ft 7 in). The program was declassified in February 1995. Approximately 365 Agena spacecraft supported a wide variety of missions, from NASA's early interplanetary efforts; to the US Navy's SeaSat, the USAF's Corona, Midas and Samos series between January 1959 and February 1987, when the last Agena D was launched.

The Corona program led to the development of the KH-7 Gambit and KH-9 Hexagon programs. The first Gambit system, launched in 1963, was equipped with a 77 in (2,000 mm) focal length camera system. The second system, KH-8 Gambit 3, was equipped with the camera system that included a 175 in (4,400 mm) focal length camera. The system was first launched in 1966 and provided the U.S. with exquisite surveillance capabilities from space for nearly two decades. Hexagon was first launched in 1971 to improve upon Corona's capability to image broad denied areas for threats to the United States. Twelve of the 19 systems flown also carried a mapping camera to aid in U.S. military war planning. In addition, Gambit and Hexagon were launched aboard rockets built by Lockheed Martin heritage companies. Gambit 1 was launched on an Atlas launch vehicle with the orbiting Agena D upper stage and Gambit 3 was launched using a Titan IIIB booster. Hexagon was launched aboard the larger Titan IIID launch vehicle.

Lockheed achieved the first hit-to-kill of an Intercontinental ballistic missile ICBM reentry vehicle in 1984 with the Homing Overlay Experiment, using the Kinetic Kill Vehicle (KKV) force of impact alone to destroy a mock warhead outside the Earth's atmosphere. The KKV was equipped with an infrared seeker, guidance electronics and a propulsion system. Once in space, the KKV could extend a folded structure similar to an umbrella skeleton of 4 m (13 ft) diameter to enhance its effective cross section. This device would destroy the Minuteman RV with a closing speed of about 20,000 ft/s (6,100 m/s) at an altitude of more than 100 mi (160 km). Further testing produced the Terminal High Altitude Area Defense (THAAD) Weapon System, the Medium Extended Air Defense System (MEADS) and the Multiple Kill Vehicle (MKV).

The Titan I was the first version of the Titan family of rockets, developed in October 1955, when the U.S. Air Force awarded the then Martin Company in Denver, Colorado, a contract to build an Intercontinental ballistic missile (ICBM). It was the United States' first two-stage rocket and formed an integral part of their strategic deterrent force. In the early 1960s, the rocket was adapted to launch the Gemini capsule that carried two people at a time into space. Titan II succeeded in launching 12 Gemini spacecraft and has also helped to launch the Viking missions to Mars, Voyager 1 and 2 and most recently Cassini–Huygens to Saturn. It began as a backup ICBM project in case the Atlas was delayed. It was a two-stage rocket powered by RP-1 and LOX. The Titan I and Atlas ICBMs using RP-1/LOX fuel did not have a quick launch sequence. They took about 30 minutes to fuel up and fire. Most Titan rockets were derivatives of the Titan II ICBM. The Titan II ICBM had one W-53 warhead with a 9 megaton yield, making it the most powerful ICBM on-standby in the U.S. nuclear arsenal. The Titan III was a modified Titan II with optional solid rocket boosters. It was developed by the U.S. Air Force as a heavy-lift satellite launcher to be used mainly to launch U.S. Military payloads such as Defense Support Program (DSP) early-warning, intelligence (spy), and defense communications satellites. The Titan IV is a stretched Titan III with non-optional solid rocket boosters. It could be launched either with the Centaur upper stage, with the Inertial Upper Stage (IUS) or without any upper stage. It was almost exclusively used to launch U.S. military payloads, though it was also used to launch NASA's Cassini–Huygens probe to Saturn in 1997.

On 8 February 2020, Lockheed announced it selected Los Angeles-based rocket-builder ABL Space to launch a mission from Scotland in two years, which the companies expect to be the first from the U.K. and first from European soil.

=== Mergers and acquisitions ===
RCA Astro-Electronics Division, a division of RCA. In March 1958, RCA established Astro Electronics Products (AEP) as a division of RCA Defense Electronic Products. This spacecraft design and manufacturing facility, also referred to as the RCA Space Center was located in East Windsor, New Jersey.

On 18 December 1958, RCA Astro successfully launched its first communications satellite from Cape Canaveral. It was called SCORE, (Signal Communications by Orbiting Relay Equipment). SCORE brought the world's first voice message from space. RCA Astro went on to become one of the leading American manufacturers of satellites and other space systems, including the world's first weather satellite, TIROS, launched in 1960.

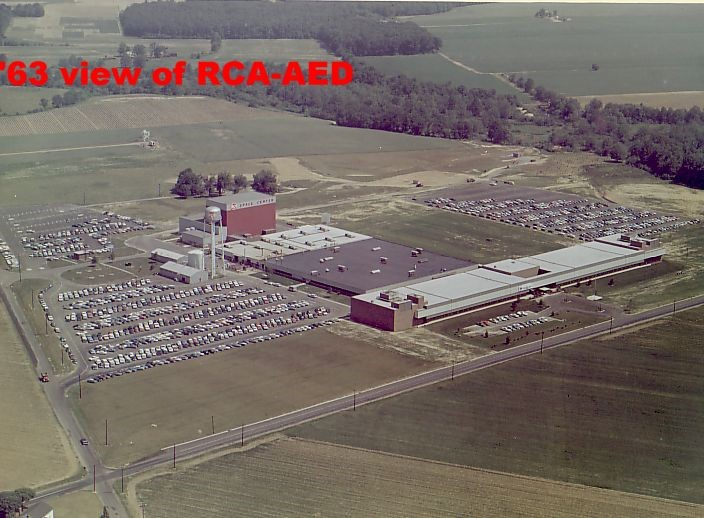
RCA Astro Space Facility in East Windsor, NJ CIRCA 1963.

In 1985, two members of the Astro Electronics engineering staff, Bob Cenker and Gerard E. Magilton, were selected to train as NASA Payload Specialists for the Space Shuttle Columbia mission designated as STS-61-C. The primary goal of the flight was to deliver a communications satellite, RCA Americom Satcom KU-1, designed and built at the Astro-Electronics facility, into orbit. Cenker was selected as a member of the flight crew, and Magilton was assigned as the back-up. When Columbia launched on 12 January 1986, Bob Cenker became RCA Astro-Electronic's first astronaut. Following the destruction of Space Shuttle Challenger with the next Shuttle mission, civilian Payload Specialists were excluded from flying Shuttle missions until 1990. By that time, RCA had been purchased by General Electric, and RCA Astro-Electronics became part of GE. As a result, Cenker was the only RCA Astro-Electronics employee, and only employee in the history of the facility under all of its subsequent names, to ever fly in space.

The facility operated as GE Astro Space until it was sold to Martin Marietta in 1993. Then in 1995 it became part of the newly named Lockheed Martin following the Martin Marietta merger with the Lockheed. Soon after the merger, Lockheed Martin announced that the New Jersey facility would be closed. The New Jersey facility completed work on the in-process projects over the next few years, including the development of the Inmarsat 3 Series Spacecraft. Inmarsat used the latest spot-beam technology and higher power to supply voice and data communications services worldwide to mobile terminals as small as pocket-size messaging units on ships, aircraft and vehicles.

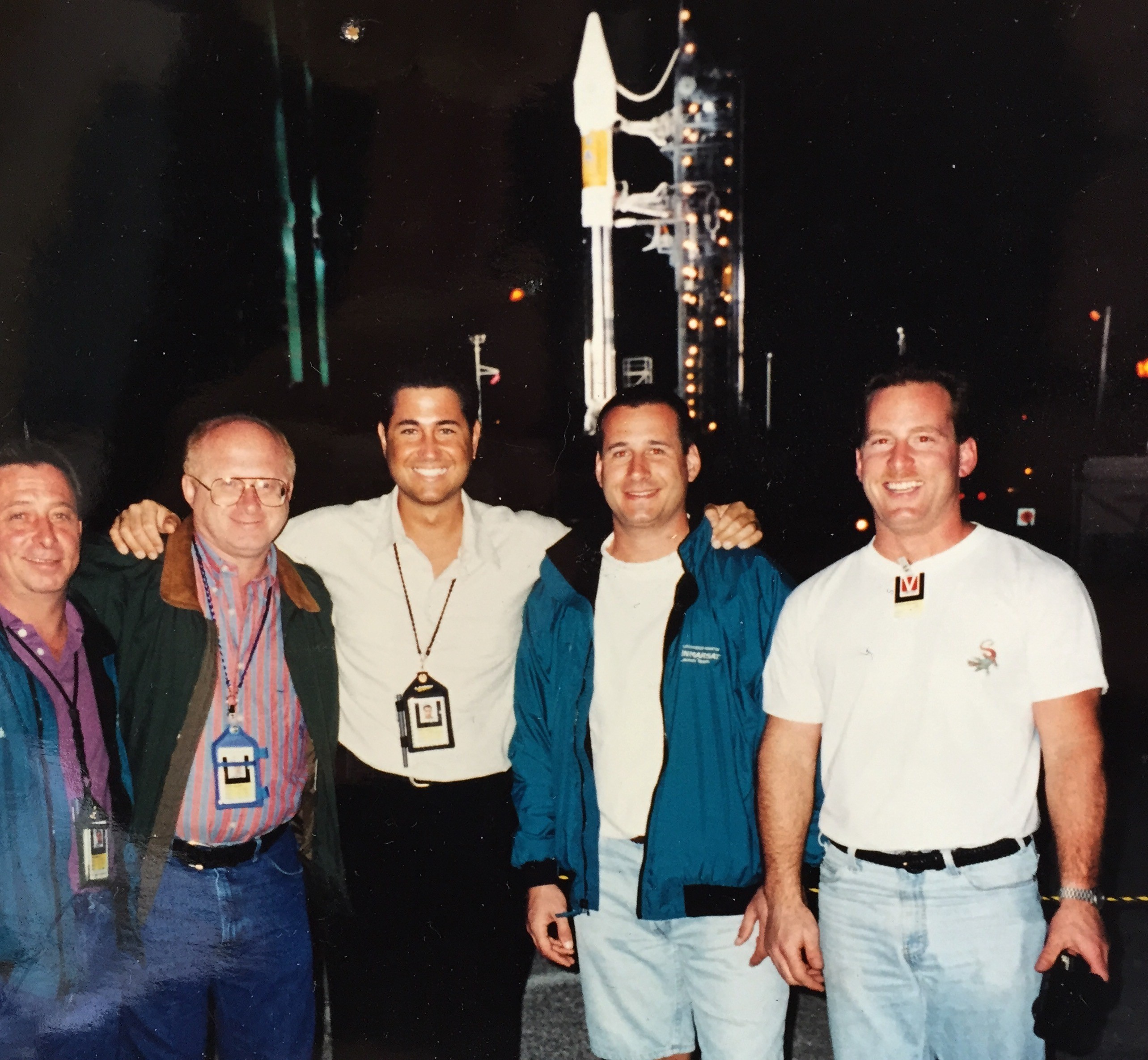
Lockheed Martin Inmarsat Series 3 Spacecraft on Launch Pad 36A Kennedy Space Center, FL 3 April 1996.

As the facility competed its backlog of ongoing commercial and government space projects some of the work was also transferred to other Lockheed Martin facilities, including the heritage-Lockheed facility in Sunnyvale, California, and a newly built facility in Newtown, Pennsylvania. The facility that began as RCA Astro Electronics closed for good in 1998.

Lockheed Martin Space Systems is headquartered in Denver, but still does considerable operations from Sunnyvale. Also located near Sunnyvale is the main office of Lockheed Martin's space research and development group, the Advanced Technology Center (ATC), formerly the Lockheed Palo Alto Research Laboratory (LPARL).

On 31 August 2006, NASA selected Lockheed Martin Corp., based in Bethesda, Maryland, as the prime contractor to design, develop, and build Orion, U.S.-European spacecraft for a new generation of explorers. As of 21 May 2011, the Orion spacecraft was being developed for crewed missions to Moon and then Mars. It will be launched by the Space Launch System.

In November 2010, Lockheed Martin Space Systems was selected by NASA for consideration for potential contract awards for heavy lift launch vehicle system concepts, and propulsion technologies.

In June 2014, the company was contracted by the United States Air Force on a fixed-price basis to build the fifth and sixth Geosynchronous Earth Orbit (GEO) satellites, known as GEO-5 and GEO-6, for the Space-Based Infrared System (SBIRS) at a cost of US$1.86 billion.

In June 2015, Lockheed Martin announced plans to expand its workforce at Cape Canaveral, Florida, in order to support the U.S. Navy's Trident II D5 Fleet Ballistic Missile program.

== Lines of business ==
Lockheed Martin Space comprises five Lines of Business (LOBs). Each of these is a P & L (profit and loss center) focused on a set of specific customers and related products. Each LOB is led by a vice president and general manager.

=== Commercial Civil Space ===
Vice President and General Manager: Kyle Griffin

Customers: NASA, NOAA, international space agencies
Products: Earth observation, lunar and planetary exploration, and human spaceflight systems

- NASA's Orion spacecraft
- NOAA's Geostationary Operational Environmental Satellite (GOES-R) weather satellite series
- NASA's MAVEN
- NASA's JUNO
- NASA's OSIRIS-REx
- NASA's InSight
- NASA's Lucy
- NASA's VERITAS
- NASA's DAVINCI+

==== Heritage Programs ====
- NASA's Space Shuttle external tank
- NASA's Hubble Space Telescope (a former Lockheed project)
- NASA's Spitzer Space Telescope (a former Lockheed project)
- NASA's Lunar Prospector (a former Lockheed project)
- NASA's Gravity Probe B (a former Lockheed project)
- NASA's Gravity Recovery and Interior Laboratory (GRAIL)
- NASA's Landsat 7 (a former Lockheed project)
- NOAA's TIROS, or Television Infrared Observation Satellite
- NASA's Phoenix Lander
- NASA's Mars Odyssey
- NASA's Mars Reconnaissance Orbiter
- NASA's Mars Global Surveyor
- NASA's Mars Viking Landers

=== Military Space ===
Vice President and General Manager: Johnathon Caldwell

Customers: USAF, US Navy, DARPA, allied military agencies
Products: Surveillance, early warning and navigation satellites

- SBIRS Space-Based Infrared System
- GPS-III
- MUOS Mobile User Objective System
- AEHF Advanced Extremely High Frequency

==== Heritage Programs ====
- GPS-IIR
- Milstar
- DMSP Defense Meteorological Satellite Program

=== Mission Solutions ===
Vice President and General Manager: Stacy Kubicek

Customers: USAF, US Navy, DARPA, allied government agencies, commercial satellite operators
Products: satellite ground systems, mission architecture, sensor processing & analysis, cyber protection

- SBIRS Space-Based Infrared System ground architecture

=== Strategic and Missile Defense Systems ===
Vice President and General Manager: Sarah Hiza

Customers: USN, USAF, DARPA, MDA, UK Royal Navy
Products: Missiles, hypersonic reentry vehicles, kill vehicles, battle management software, and directed energy weapons

- Terminal High Altitude Area Defense (THAAD)
- USAF ICBM Reentry Systems
- Trident II D5 Fleet Ballistic Missile (FBM) Lockheed Martin continues manufacturing responsibility for the current model. Deployed with the US Navy and Royal Navy.
- Targets and Countermeasures (Unarmed ballistic missile targets used in testing of the elements of the Ballistic Missile Defense System)

==== Heritage Programs ====
- Airborne Laser Test Bed (ALTB) Beam Control/Fire Control System
- DARPA Falcon Project Falcon
- Multiple Kill Vehicle (MKV)
- Exoatmospheric Reentry-vehicle Interception System
- Homing Overlay Experiment
- Polaris
- Poseidon
- Trident I

=== Special Programs ===
Vice President and General Manager: Maria Demaree

Customers: undisclosed
Products: classified missions

== See also ==
- Airbus Defence and Space
- Boeing Defense, Space & Security
- NewSpace
- Northrop Grumman
