= Space-Based Infrared System =

Missile warning and defence system

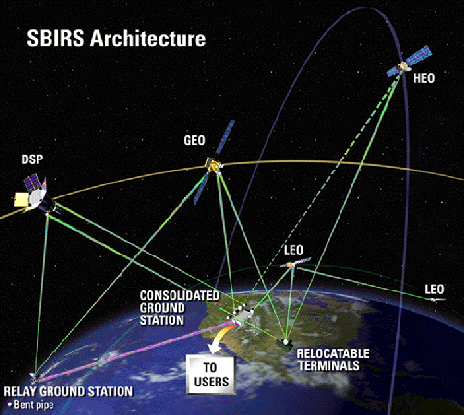
Configuration of SBIRS systems: GEO, HEO and Low components.

The Space-Based Infrared System (SBIRS) is a United States Space Force system intended to meet the United States' Department of Defense infrared space surveillance needs through the first two to three decades of the 21st century. The SBIRS program is designed to provide key capabilities in the areas of missile warning, missile defense, battlespace characterization and technical intelligence via satellites in geosynchronous Earth orbit (GEO), sensors hosted on satellites in highly elliptical orbit (HEO), and ground-based data processing and control.

A total of twelve satellites carrying SBIRS or STSS payloads had been launched: SBIRS GEO-1 (USA-230, 2011), SBIRS GEO-2 (USA-241, 2013), SBIRS GEO-3 (USA-273, 2017), SBIRS GEO-4 (USA-282, 2018), SBIRS GEO-5 (USA-315, 2021), SBIRS GEO-6 (USA-336, 2022), SBIRS HEO-1 (USA-184, 2006), SBIRS HEO-2 (USA-200, 2008), SBIRS HEO-3 (USA-259, 2014), STSS-ATRR (USA-205, 2009), STSS Demo 1 (USA-208, 2009) and STSS Demo 2 (USA-209, 2009). The manufacturing contract for SBIRS GEO-5 and SBIRS GEO-6 was awarded in 2014. Funding for SBIRS GEO-7 and SBIRS GEO-8 was canceled in 2019.

== Background ==
Based on its experiences with the launching of short-range theater missiles by Iraq during the 1991 Persian Gulf War, the U.S. Department of Defense (DoD) concluded that expanded theater missile warning capabilities were needed, and it began planning for an improved infrared satellite sensor capability that would support both long-range strategic and short-range theater ballistic missile warning and defense operations. In 1994, DoD studied consolidating various infrared space requirements, such as for ballistic missile warning and defense, technical intelligence, and battlespace characterization, and it selected SBIRS to replace and enhance the capabilities provided by the Defense Support Program (DSP). DSP satellites are built with infrared detectors that can sense missile plumes, and have been providing early warning for long-range ballistic missile launches for over 30 years. DoD had previously attempted to replace DSP with:

- the Advanced Warning System in the early 1980s
- the Boost Surveillance and Tracking System in the late 1980s
- the Follow-on Early Warning System in the early 1990s

According to the Government Accountability Office (GAO), these attempts failed due to immature technology, high cost, and affordability issues. SBIRS is to use more sophisticated infrared technologies than the DSP to enhance the detection of strategic and theater ballistic missile launches and the performance of the missile-tracking function.

The original contract consisted of 2 SBIRS HEO satellite sensors and 2-3 SBIRS GEO sensors (and satellites) with an option to buy a total of 5 GEOs. A complement of satellites in low Earth orbit (LEO) was planned as part of the program (SBIRS-Low), but this has been moved into the Space Tracking and Surveillance System (STSS) program.

SBIRS continues to struggle with cost overruns, with Nunn-McCurdy breaches occurring in 2001 and 2005. By September 2007, the expected project cost had increased to US$10.4 billion. In December 2005, following the third SBIRS Nunn-McCurdy violation, the government decided to compete SBIRS GEO-4 and SBIRS GEO-5, with an option to buy the SBIRS GEO-3 contingent based on the performance of the first two.

On 2 June 2009, Lockheed Martin announced it had been awarded a contract for the third SBIRS HEO payload and the third SBIRS GEO satellite, and for associated ground equipment modifications. On 10 July 2009, Lockheed Martin was awarded US$262.5 million as down payment by the USAF towards the purchase of a fourth satellite. The first SBIRS GEO satellite of the SBIRS program, SBIRS GEO-1, was successfully launched from Cape Canaveral on an Atlas V launch vehicle on 7 May 2011. In June 2014, Lockheed Martin was contracted by the USAF to build SBIRS GEO-5 and SBIRS GEO-6, at a cost of US$1.86 billion.

The FY 2021 budget allocates US$2.5 billion to SBIRS for the United States Space Force.

== SBIRS High ==
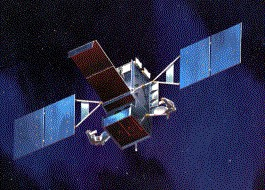
SBIRS High GEO

SBIRS High (also now simply referred to as "SBIRS") is to consist of four dedicated satellites operating in geosynchronous Earth orbit, and sensors on two host satellites operating in a highly elliptical orbit. SBIRS High will replace the Defense Support Program (DSP) satellites and is intended primarily to provide enhanced strategic and theater ballistic missile warning capabilities. SBIRS High GEO 1 was launched on 7 May 2011. Two SBIRS sensors hosted on two classified satellites in highly elliptical orbit have already been launched, probably as part of the NROL-22 (USA 184) and NROL-28 (USA 200) launches in 2006 and 2008. USA 184 and USA 200 are believed by analysts to be ELINT satellites in the family of JUMPSEAT and TRUMPET; TRUMPET has been reported to have carried an infrared sensor called HERITAGE.

The prime contractor for SBIRS is Lockheed Martin, with Northrop Grumman as the major subcontractor. Lockheed Martin also provides the satellite for SBIRS GEO. The system's expected deployment was delayed from December 2009 to 2011 because of problems with Lockheed's workmanship on system components, including unresolved software malfunctions and several broken solder joints in a subcontract procured gyroscope assembly on the first spacecraft being built.

It was feared that a further launch postponement into late 2011 would lead to conflict with the planned launches of NASA's Juno spacecraft and Mars Science Laboratory, which would all use the same launch facility. However, the first GEO launch, SBIRS GEO-1, was successfully conducted on 7 May 2011.

According to a Reuters report, the first two SBIRS GEO satellites started operations in 2013. SBIRS GEO-3 launched on 20 January 2017, and SBIRS GEO-4 was successfully deployed on 20 January 2018. In 2017, the United States Air Force requested US$1.4 billion in Fiscal Year 2018 for SBIRS, and funds for advance procurement of SBIRS 7 and 8. While US$643 million in funding was provided for SBIRS in Fiscal Year 2019, funding for SBIRS 7 and 8 was eliminated in favor of a new program, Next-Gen OPIR (Next-Generation Overhead Persistent Infrared). Plans remained to launch SBIRS GEO-5 in 2021 and SBIRS GEO-6 in 2022. SBIRS GEO-5 was successfully launched on 18 May 2021, while SBIRS GEO-6 was successfully launched on 4 August 2022.

== SBIRS Low (Space Tracking and Surveillance System) ==
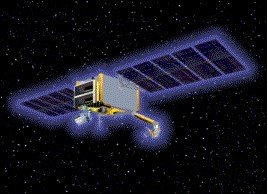
SBIRS Low

The SBIRS Low contract is now managed by the Missile Defense Agency (MDA) and has been renamed the Space Tracking and Surveillance System (STSS).

=== Original SBIRS Low ===
The SBIRS Low program was originally expected to consist of about 24 satellites in low Earth orbit. The primary purpose of SBIRS Low was the tracking of ballistic missiles; with discrimination between warheads and other objects, such as decoys, that separate from the missile bodies throughout the middle portion of their flights. The system was to have two major sensors, coordinated by an on-board computer:

- a scanning infrared sensor, designed to acquire ballistic missiles in the early stages of flight, and
- a tracking infrared sensor, designed to follow missiles, warheads, and other objects such as debris and decoys during the middle and later stages of flight. The tracking sensor would be cooled to very low temperatures.

SBIRS Low's original deployment schedule was 2010, the date when its capabilities were said to be needed by the National Missile Defense System.

=== Space Tracking and Surveillance System ===
In 2001, the Missile Defense Agency assessed the programs needed for a national ballistic missile defense system (BMDS) and found that they were lacking in the relatively new arena of space. The MDA decided to absorb the SBIRS Low constellation in its very early stages of development and renamed the program the Space Tracking and Surveillance System (STSS). This transition changed the direction of the program somewhat, but the overall mission remained the same — detection and tracking of ballistic missiles through all phases of flight.

== See also ==
- NG-OPIR
- Sentient (intelligence analysis system)
