= Defense Support Program =

US infrared satellite early warning system

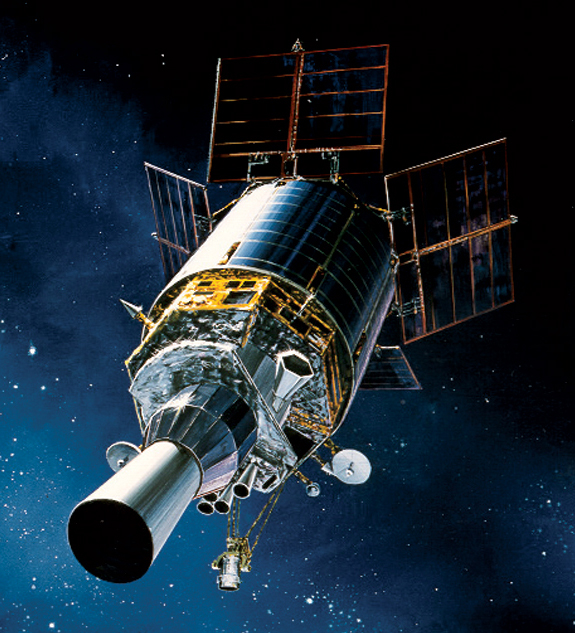
Painting of a DSP satellite on station. Primary sensor (lower left) is pointed at Earth. The star tracker is seen pointing off to the side, above and to the right.

The Defense Support Program (DSP) is a program of the United States Space Force that operated the reconnaissance satellites which form the principal component of the Satellite Early Warning System used by the United States.

DSP satellites, which are operated by Mission Delta 4, detect missile or spacecraft launches and nuclear explosions using sensors that detect the infrared emissions from these intense sources of heat. During Desert Storm, for example, DSP was able to detect the launches of Iraqi Scud missiles and provide timely warnings to civilians and military forces in Israel and Saudi Arabia.

The satellites are in geosynchronous orbits, and are equipped with infrared sensors operating through a wide-angle Schmidt telescope (Ref: Lapin, Surveillance by Satellite, Journal of Defense Research, Vol 8, #2, 1976, declassified in 1994). The entire satellite spins so that the linear sensor array in the focal plane scans over the Earth six times every minute.

Initially, DSP satellites were launched on Titan IIIC rockets starting in 1970 (Ref: Simmons and Creswell, "Defense Support Program," Aerospace Corporation Crosslink, Vol 1, #2, 2000). Typically, DSP satellites were launched on Titan IVB boosters with Inertial Upper Stages. However, one DSP satellite (DSP-16) was launched using the Space Shuttle Atlantis on mission STS-44 (24 November 1991).

The last known DSP satellite (flight 23) was launched in 2007 aboard the first operational flight of the Delta IV Heavy rocket, as the Titan IV had been retired in 2005. All 23 satellites were built by the prime contractor Northrop Grumman Aerospace Systems, formerly TRW, in Redondo Beach, California.

U.S. Space Force Mission Delta 4, with headquarters at Buckley Space Force Base, Colorado, has units, primarily the 2nd Space Warning Squadron, that operate DSP satellites and report warning information, via communications links, to the NORAD and USSTRATCOM early warning centers within the Cheyenne Mountain Space Force Station, Colorado. These centers immediately forward data to various agencies and areas of operations around the world.

The SBIRS Wing at the Space Systems Command, Los Angeles Space Force Base, California is responsible for development and acquisition of the satellites.

== History ==
The Defense Support Program replaced the 1960s space-based infrared Missile Defense Alarm System (MIDAS). The first successful launch of MIDAS (MIDAS-2) was 24 May 1960 and there were twelve launches before the DSP program replaced it in 1970.

Benefiting from funds released by the cancellation of Manned Orbiting Laboratory, the first launch of a DSP (IMEWS-1 - Integrated Missile Early Warning Satellite) was on 6 November 1970 and since then it has become the mainstay of the United States ballistic missile early warning system. For the last 45 years they have provided an uninterrupted space-based early warning capability. The original DSP satellite weighed 2,000 pounds (900 kg) and had 400 watts of power, 2000 detectors and a design life of 1.25 years.

Throughout the life of the program, the satellite design has undergone numerous improvements to enhance reliability and capability. The weight grew to 5,250 pounds (2380 kg), the power to 1275 watts, the number of detectors increased threefold to 6000 and the design life has been increased to a goal of ten years.

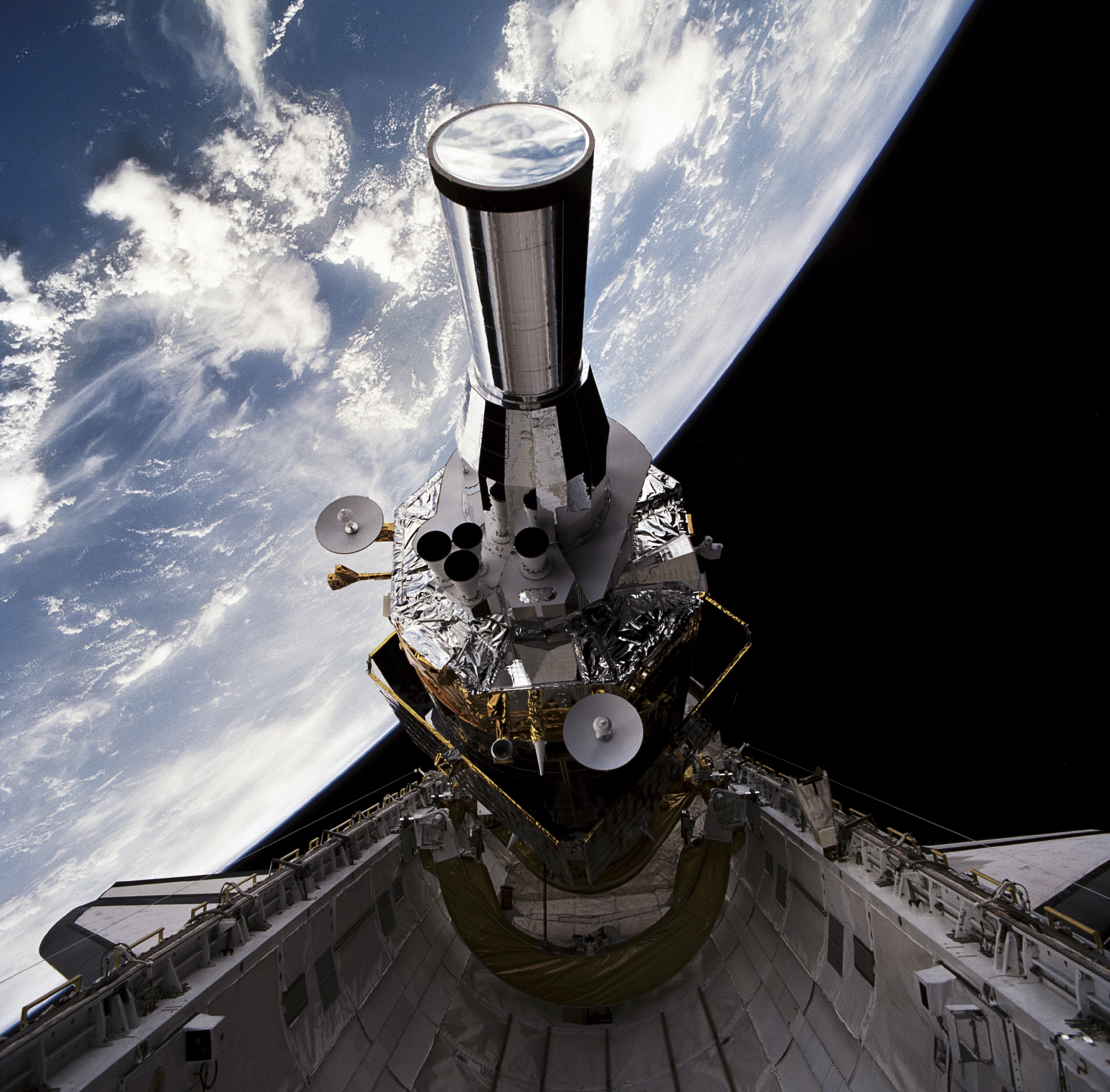
DSP satellite deployment during STS-44

The numerous improvement projects have enabled DSP to provide accurate, reliable data in the face of evolving missile threats. On-station sensor reliability has provided uninterrupted service well past their design lifetime. Recent technological improvements in sensor design include above-the-horizon capability and improved resolution. Increased on-board signal-processing capability improves clutter rejection. Enhanced reliability and survivability improvements were also incorporated.

The 23rd, and last DSP satellite (DSP-23) was scheduled to be launched on 1 April 2007, aboard a Delta IV Heavy rocket, but the launch was postponed until mid-August 2007 after two structural cracks were found in the metal launch table at pad 37B, caused by a fuel leak during testing. Further delays forced the launch back to 11 November 2007, when the satellite launched at 01:50:00 UTC (20:50 EST on 10 November). This satellite died in space sometime during 2008, for reasons unknown. It is now adrift in geosynchronous orbit and remains a potential hazard to other craft.

The Department of Defense sent a MiTEx spacecraft to inspect DSP 23 sometime in 2008.

Another DSP satellite was lost in 1999, DSP-19, after its Inertial Upper Stage failed following launch from a Titan 4B booster. DSP-19 was a USAF Defense Support Program missile early warning satellite equipped with an infrared telescope to detect rocket launches. The Titan 4B rocket placed the IUS upper stages and payload into a 188 km x 718 km x 28.6° parking orbit. The first stage on the IUS burned at 18:14 GMT and put the second stage and payload into a geosynchronous transfer orbit. The IUS second stage fired at 23:34 GMT. However, the two stages of the IUS failed to separate completely. At least one connector remained attached. This meant the second stage motor nozzle did not extend properly. When the stage fired, the vehicle tumbled during the burn and the satellite was left out of control in a useless orbit.

The project was originally to have had 25 satellites, but the last two have been canceled, mainly due to Space-Based Infrared System (SBIRS) satellites, which have been replacing DSP satellites.

There were five major improvement programs on the 23 satellites:

- Block 1: Phase I, 1970–1975, five satellites
- Block 2: Phase II, 1976–1987, seven satellites
- Block 3: Multi-Orbit Satellite Performance Improvement Modification (MOS/PIM), 1989–1991, three satellites
- Block 4: Phase II Upgrade, 1994–1997, two satellites
- Block 5: DSP-I (DSP-Improved), 1999–2007, six satellites

More recently, there has been some effort put into using DSPs' infrared sensors as part of an early warning system for natural disasters like volcanic eruptions and forest fires.

The DSP satellites were operated by the Air Force 460th Space Wing until 2020, when it was replaced by the Space Force Mission Delta 4.

== Limitations ==
The DSP constellation may have offered an excellent vantage point for an early warning system against state-centric threats such as missiles, but military analysts warn its ability to collect intelligence on non-state actors is severely limited.

== General characteristics ==
- Primary mission: strategic and tactical missile launch detection
- Contractor team: Northrop Grumman Aerospace Systems, formerly TRW (for satellite bus) and Northrop Grumman Electronic Systems, formerly Aerojet Electronics Systems (for IR sensor)
- Weight: 5,250 lb (2,380 kg)
- Orbit altitude: 22,000 miles (35,900 km)
- Power plant: solar arrays generate 1485 watts
- Height: 32.8 ft (10 m) on orbit; 28 ft (8.5 m) at launch
- Diameter: 22 ft (6.7 m) on orbit; 13.7 ft (4.2 m) at launch
- Date first deployed: 1970
- Date late deployed: 2007
- Latest Satellite Block: satellites 18–23
- Unit Cost: US$400 million

== Gallery ==
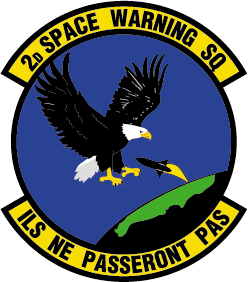
2d Space Warning Squadron

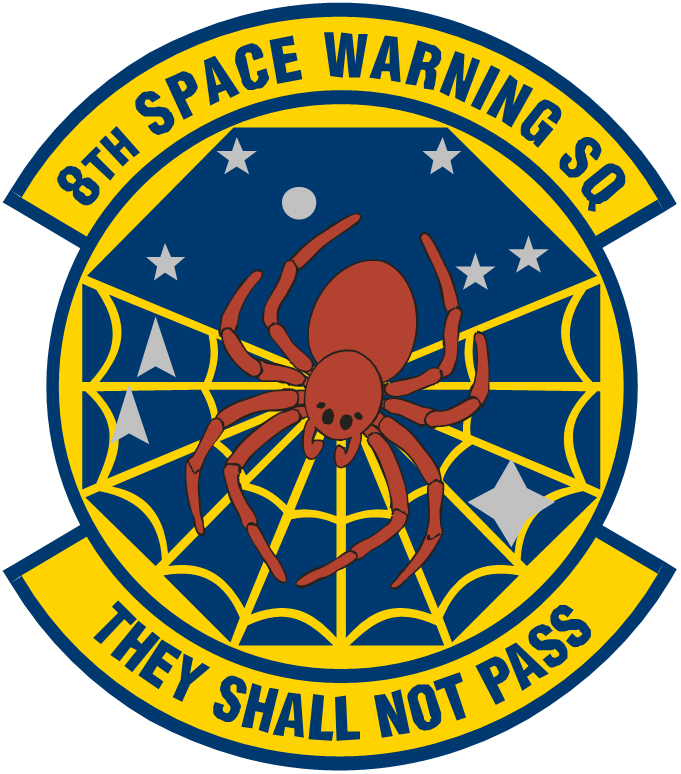
8th Space Warning Squadron

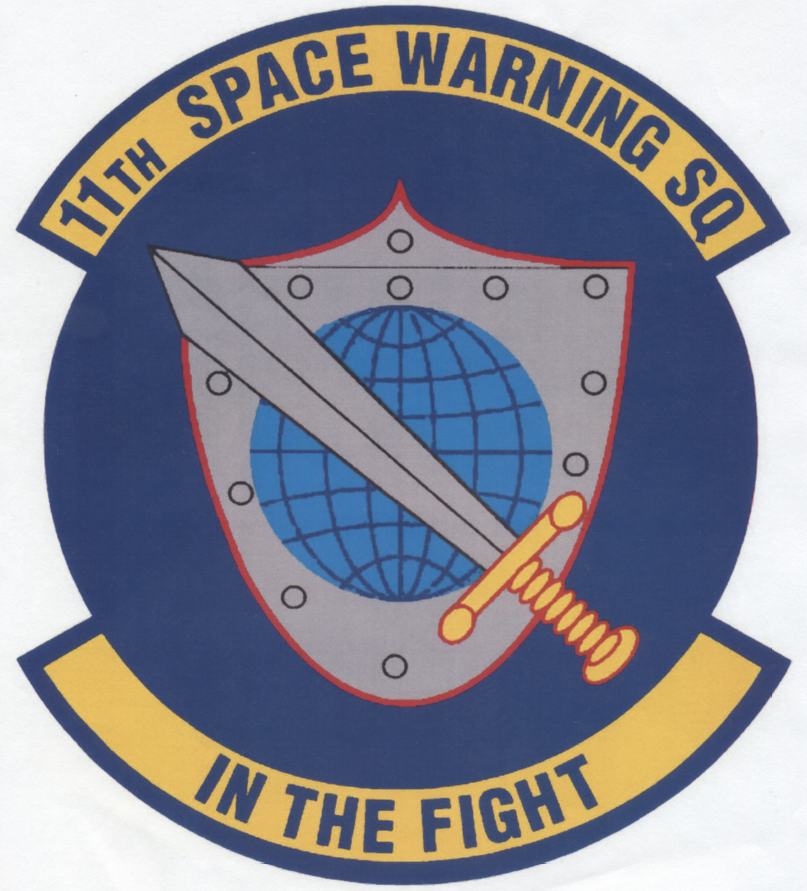
11th Space Warning Squadron

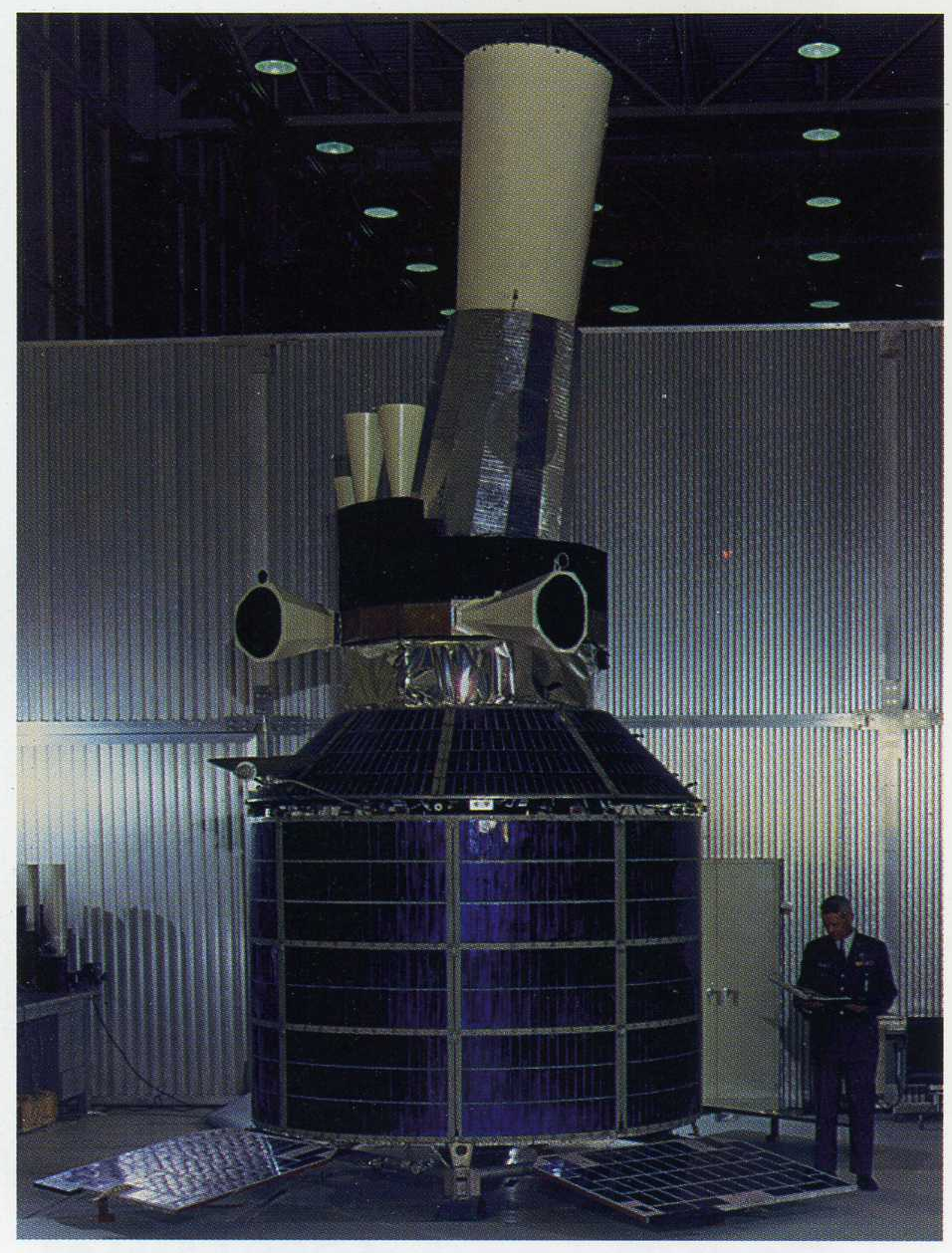
DSP Flight 1

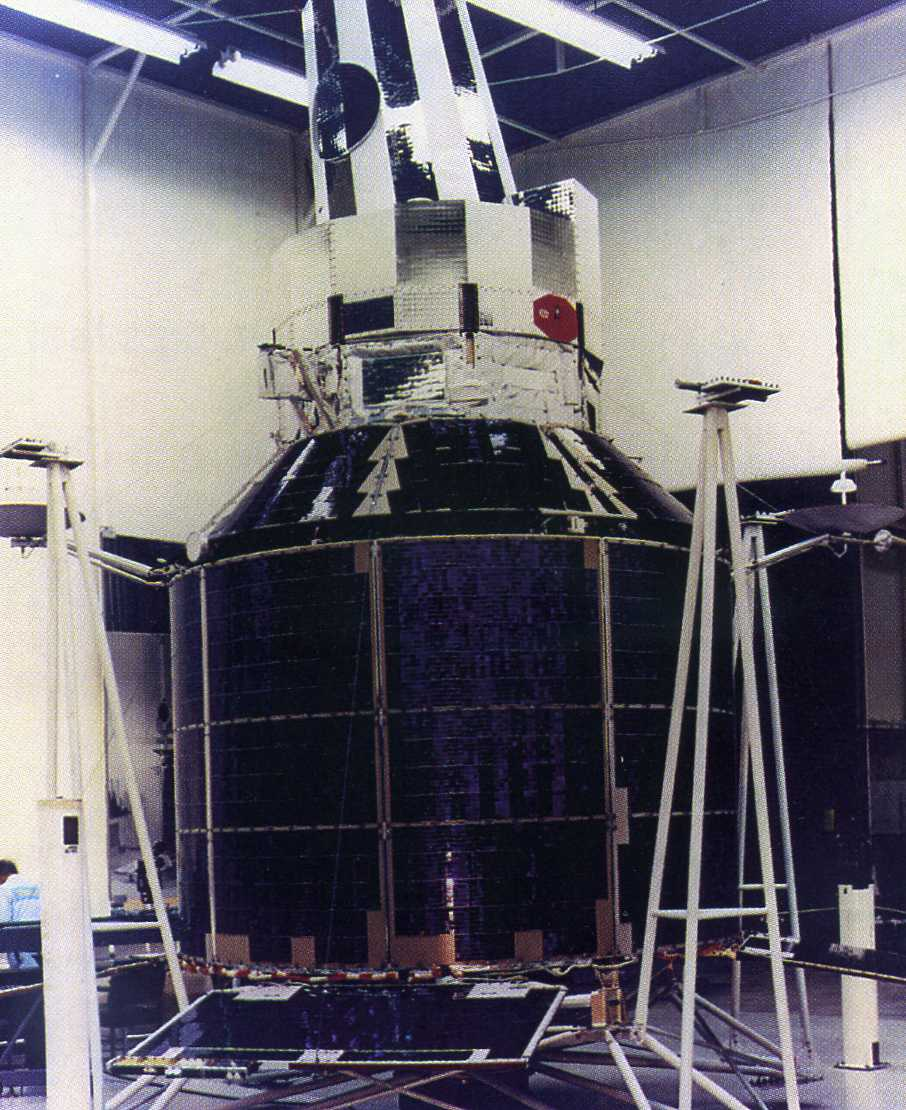
DSP Flight 2

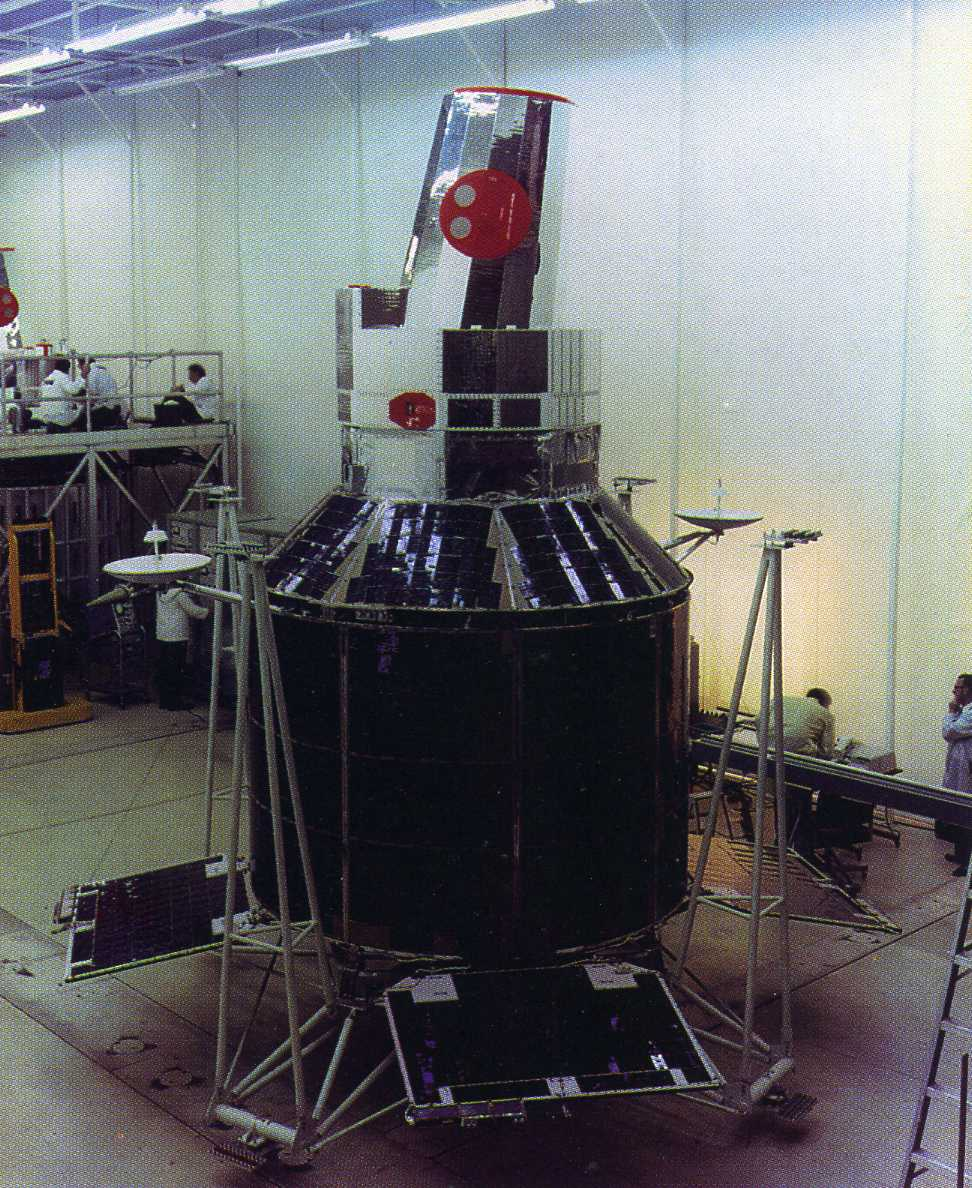
DSP Flight 3

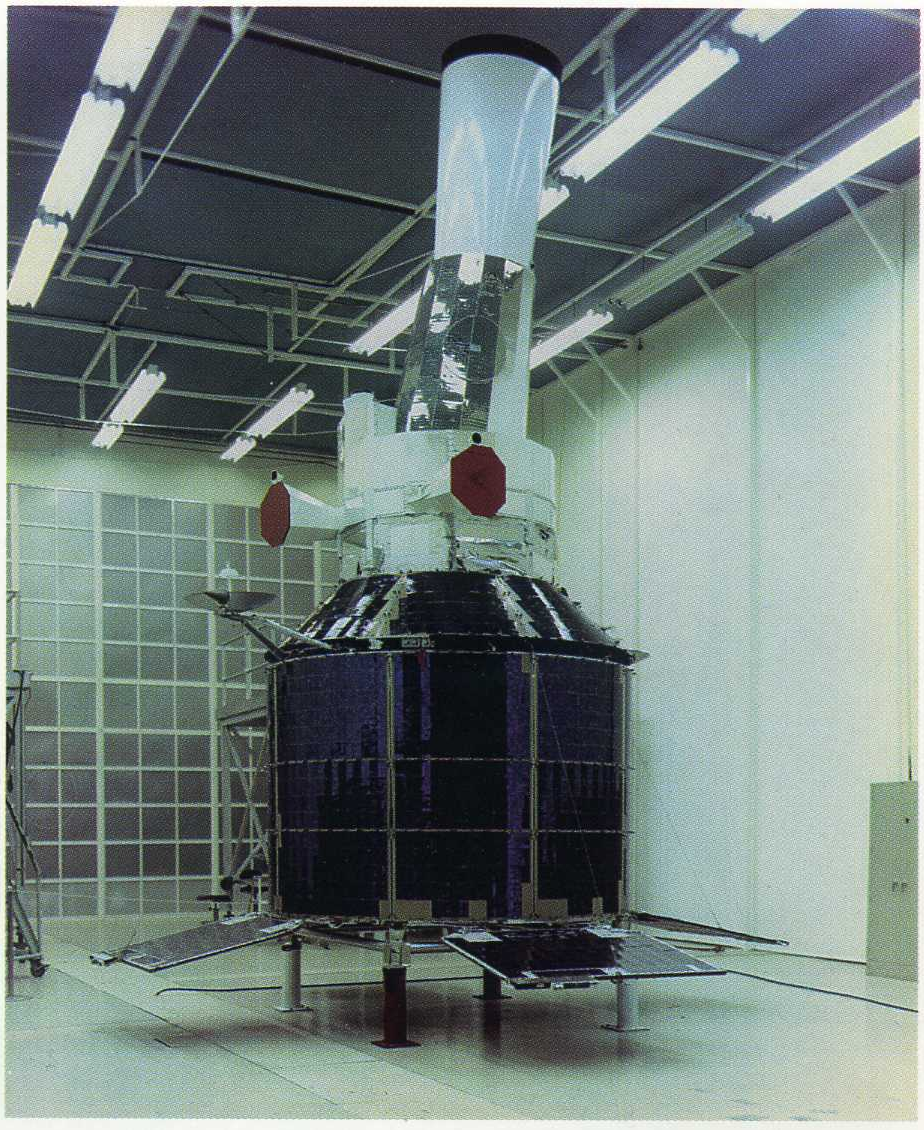
DSP Flight 4

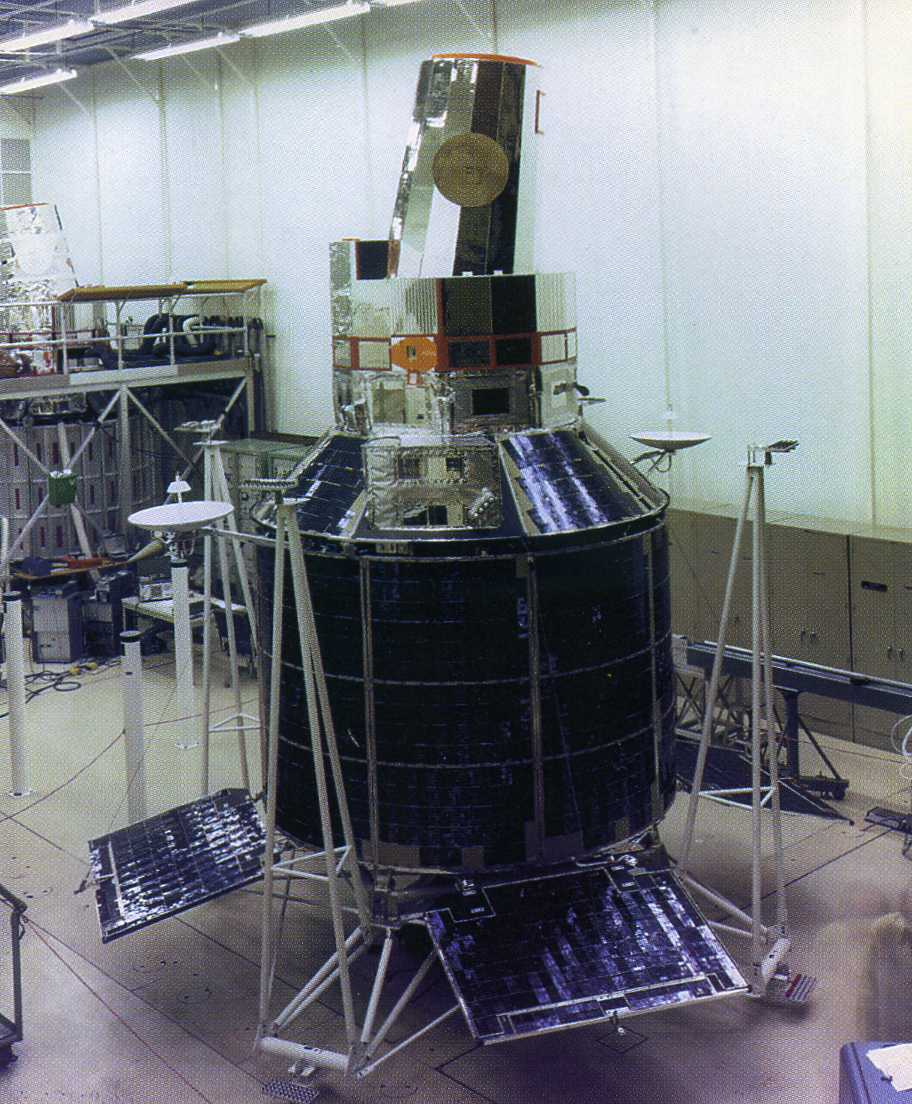
DSP Flight 5

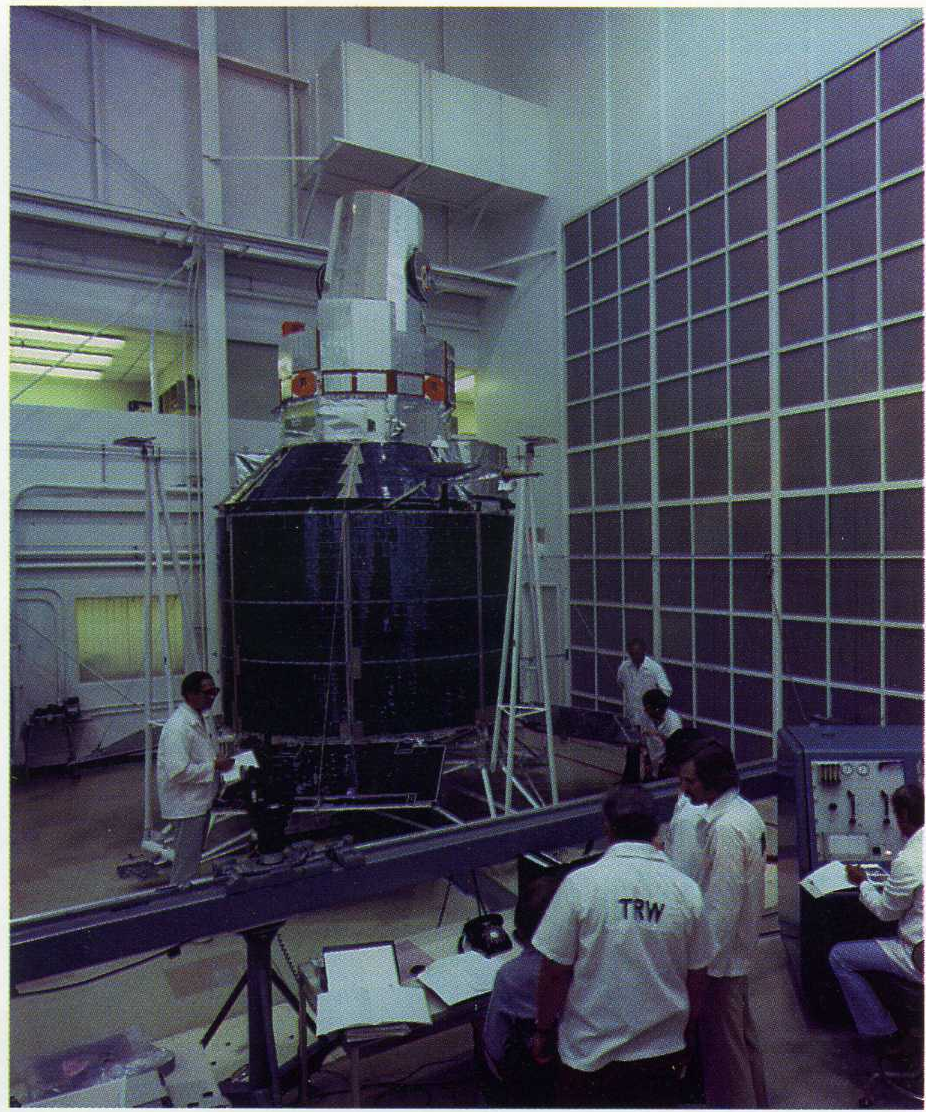
DSP Flight 7

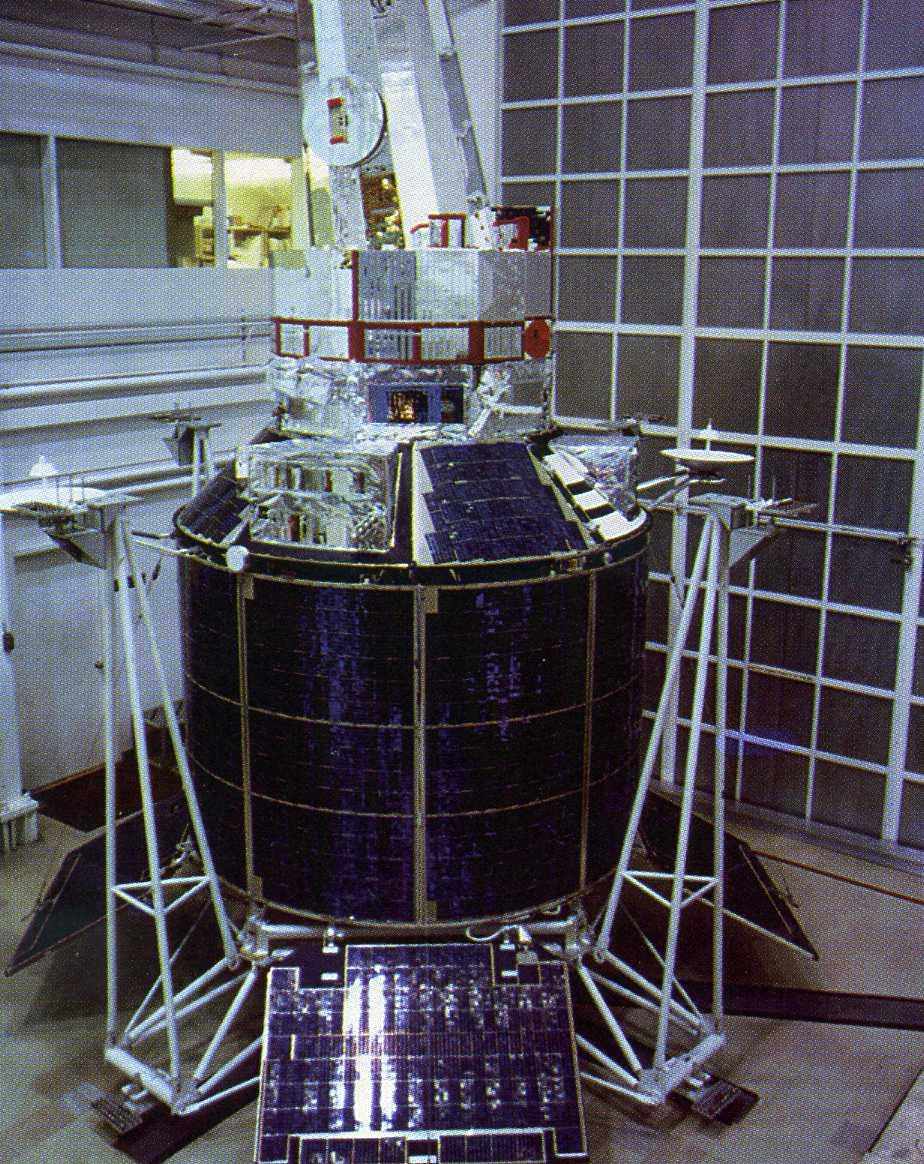
DSP Flight 8

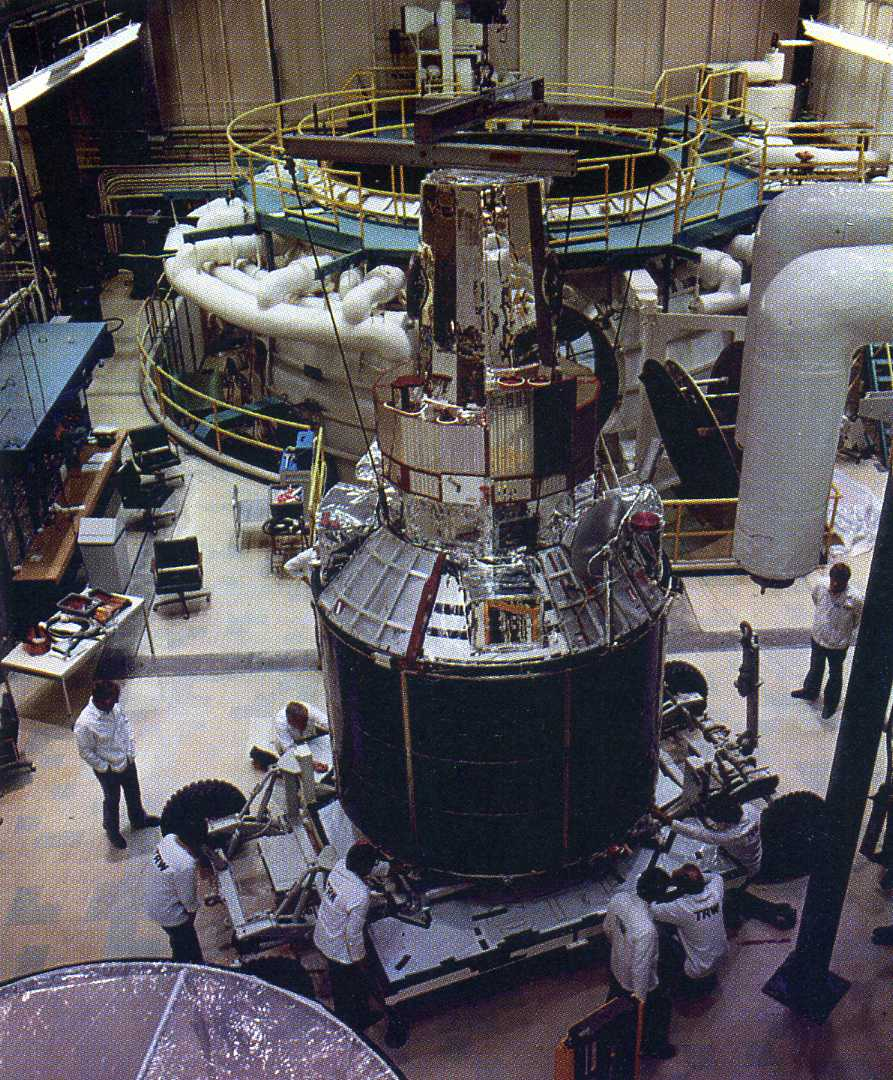
DSP Flight 9

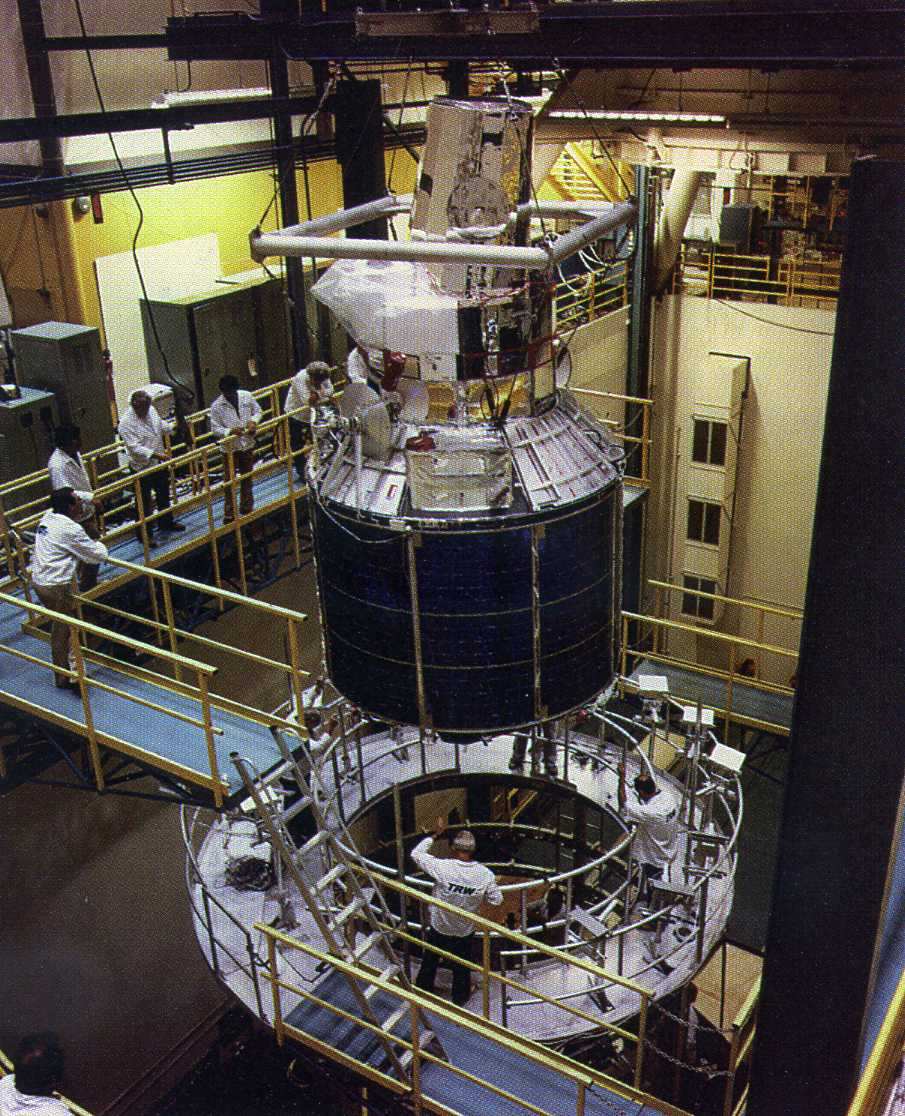
DSP Flight 10

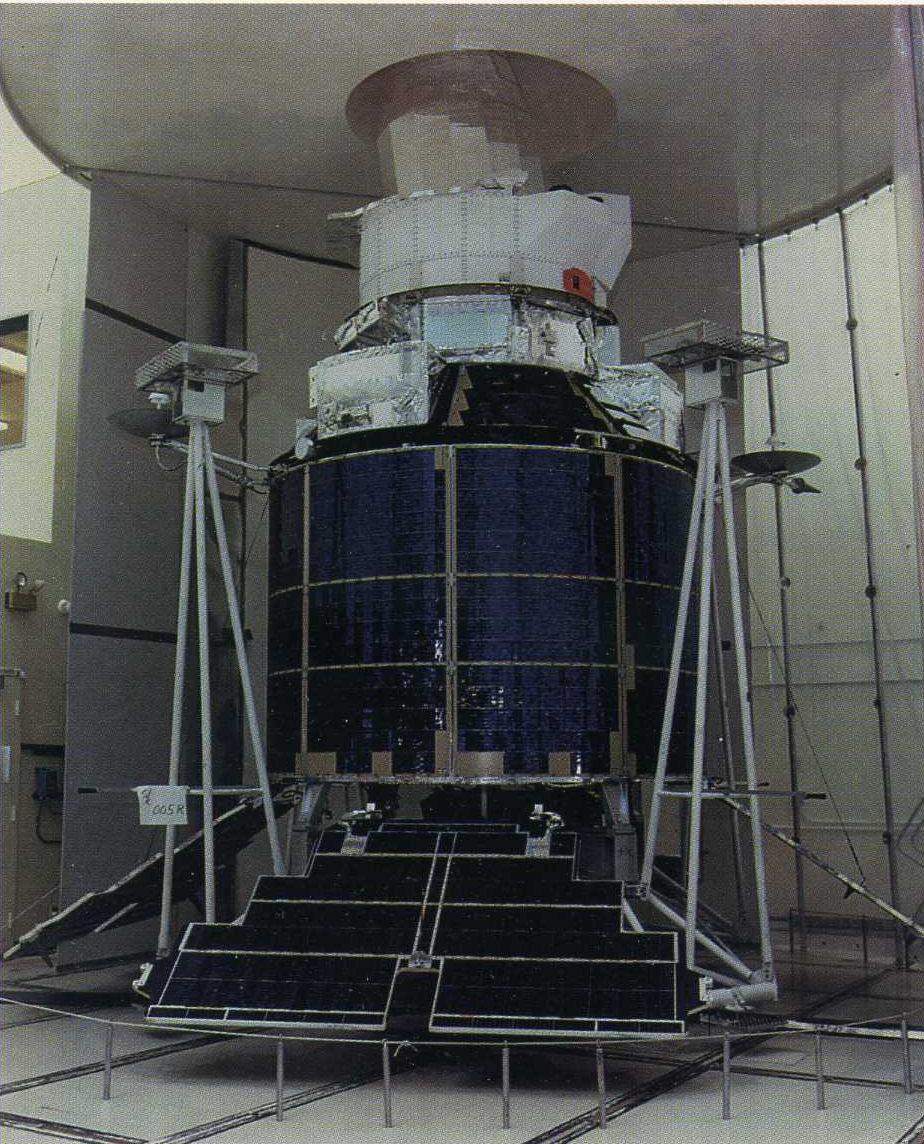
DSP Flight 13

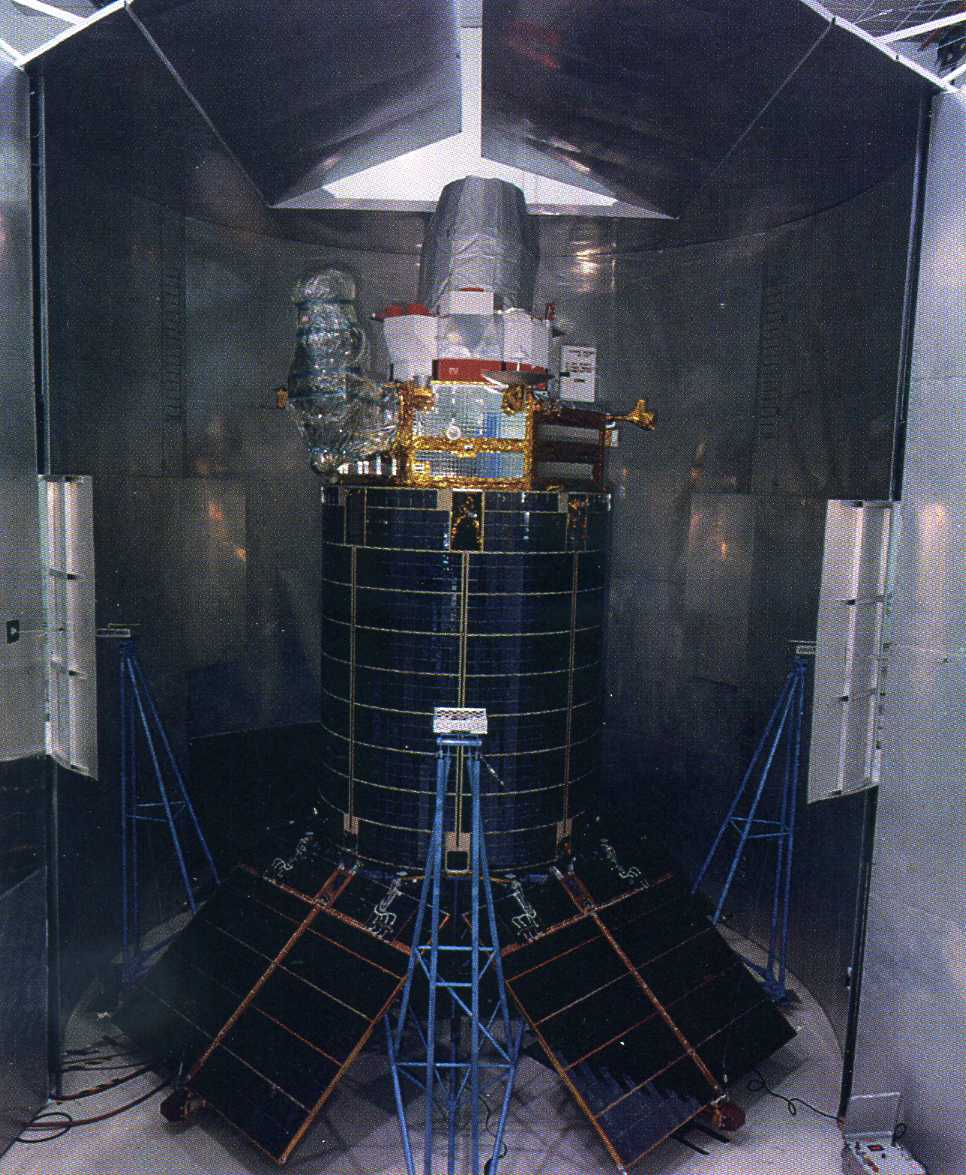
DSP Flight 14

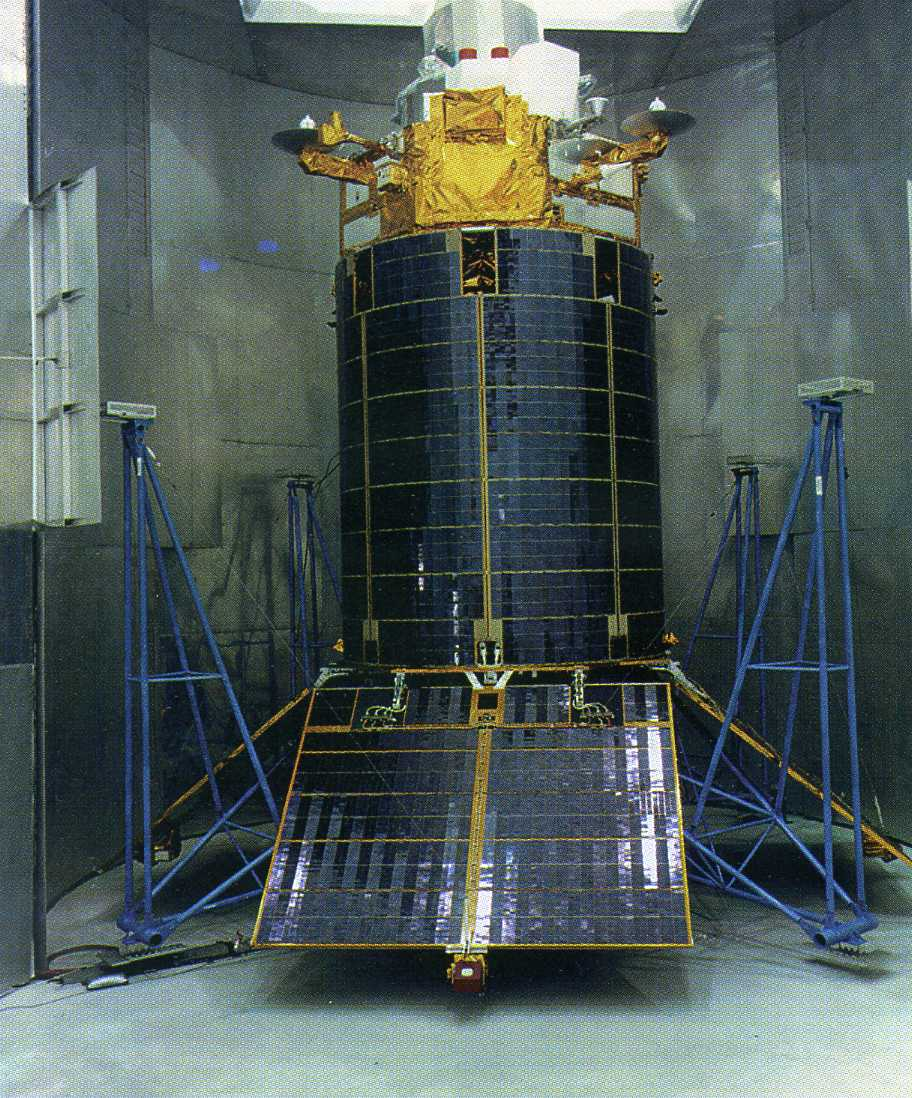
DSP Flight 15

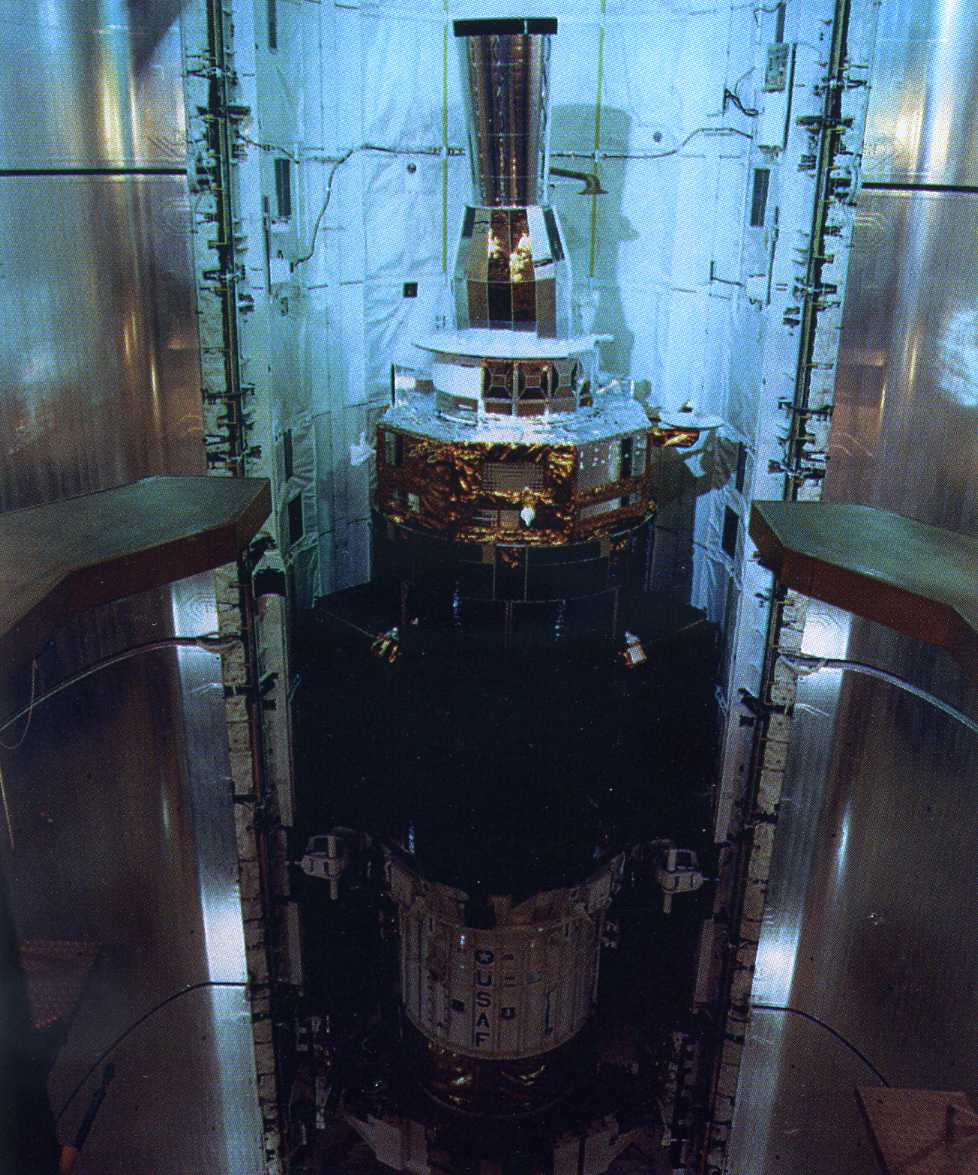
DSP Flight 16

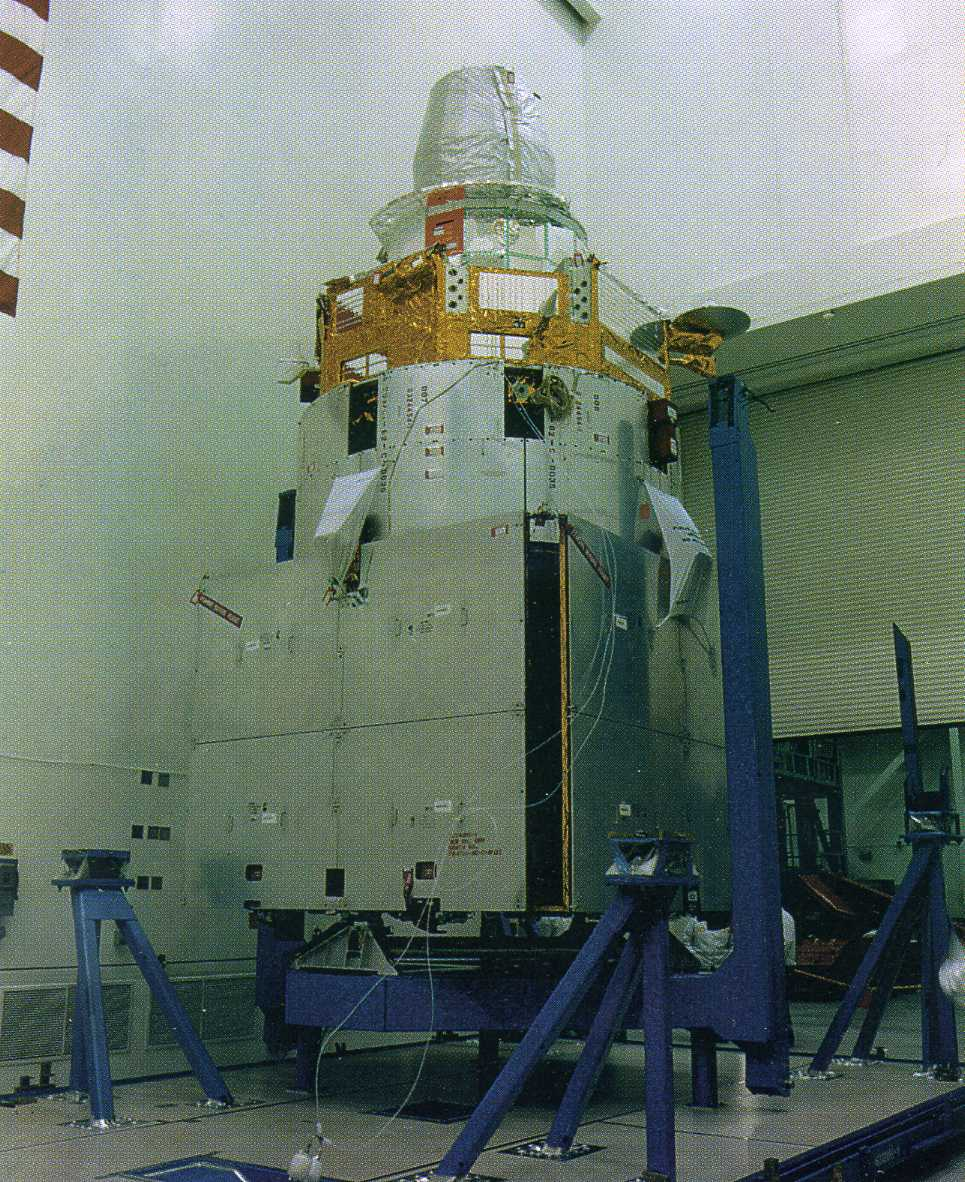
DSP Flight 17

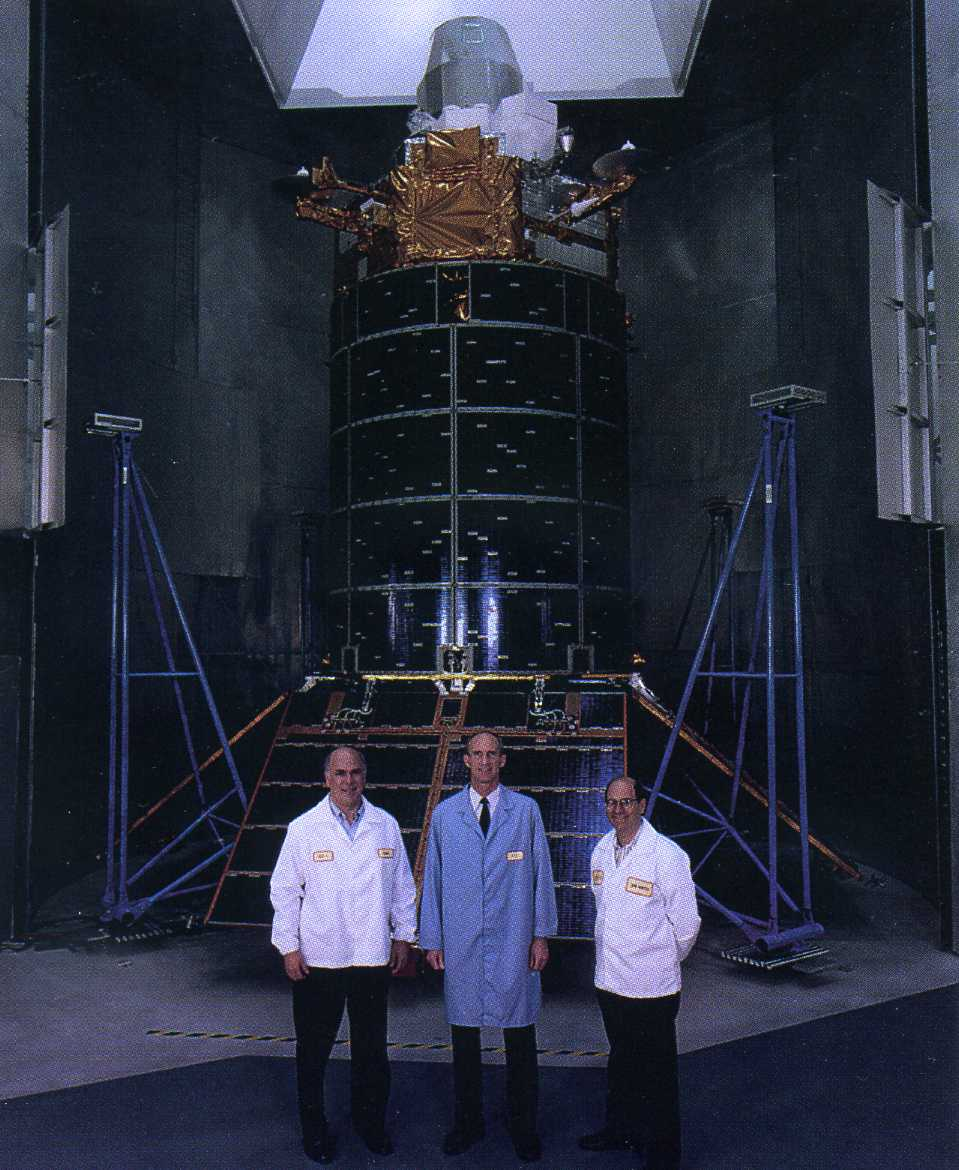
DSP Flight 18

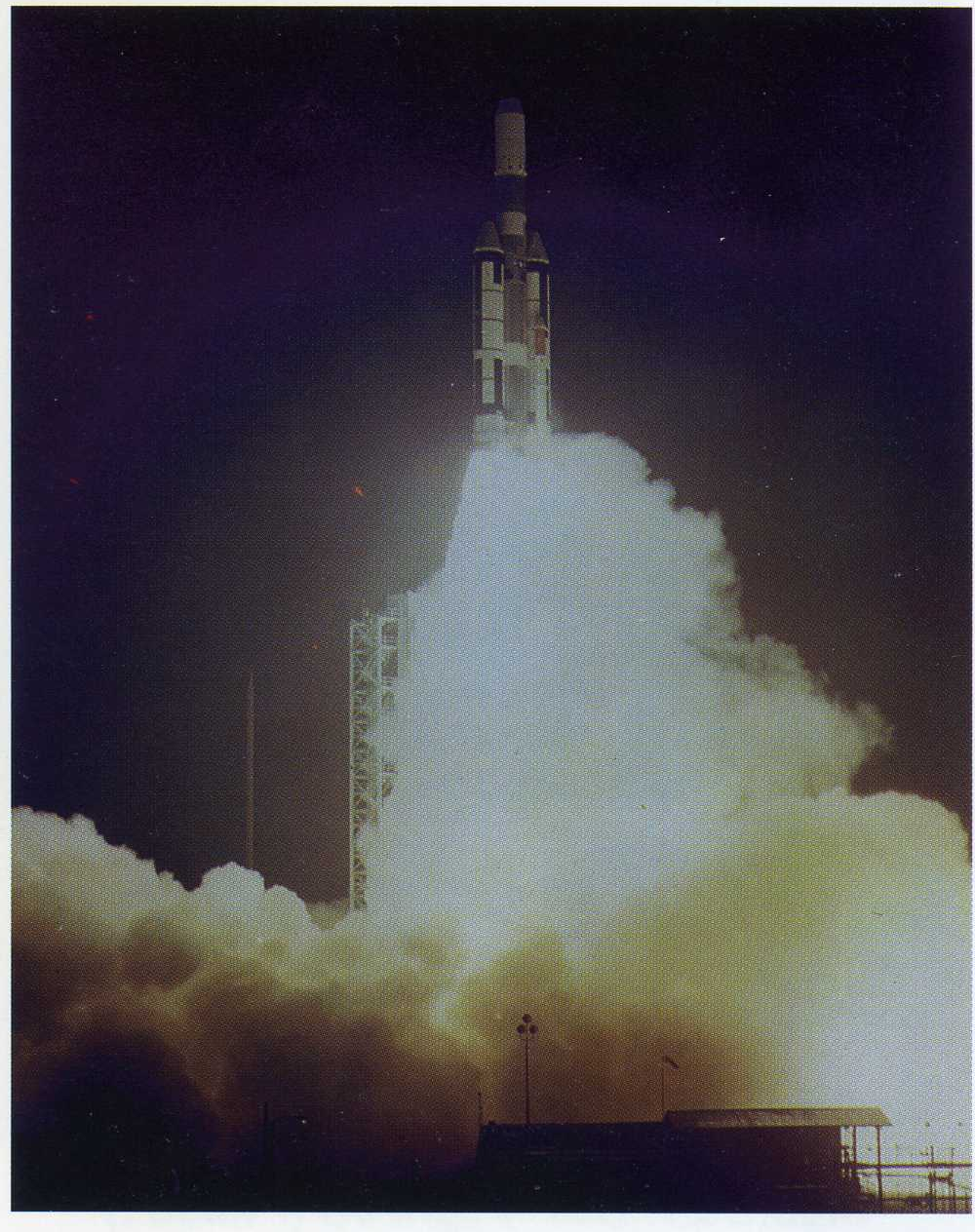
DSP F1 Launch 6 November 1970

== See also ==
- Missile Defense Alarm System (MIDAS)
- Space Based Infrared System (SBIRS)
