= Supra-arcade downflows =

Sunward-traveling plasma voids observed in the Sun's outer atmosphere

Solar flare observed by TRACE 195 Å on 2002 April 21. SADs can be seen at center frame–note the dark "tadpoles" descending toward the bright coronal loop arcade.

Supra-arcade downflows (SADs) are sunward-traveling plasma voids that are sometimes observed in the Sun's outer atmosphere, or corona, during solar flares. In solar physics, arcade refers to a bundle of coronal loops, and the prefix supra indicates that the downflows appear above flare arcades. They were first described in 1999 using the Soft X-ray Telescope (SXT) on board the Yohkoh satellite. SADs are byproducts of the magnetic reconnection process that drives solar flares, but their precise cause remains unknown.

== Observations ==
=== Description ===
SADs are dark, finger-like plasma voids that are sometimes observed descending through the hot, dense plasma above bright coronal loop arcades during solar flares. They were first reported for a flare and associated coronal mass ejection that occurred on January 20, 1999, and was observed by the SXT onboard Yohkoh. SADs are sometimes referred to as “tadpoles” for their shape and have since been identified in many other events. They tend to be most easily observed in the decay phases of long-duration flares, when sufficient plasma has accumulated above the flare arcade to make SADs visible, but they do begin earlier during the rise phase. In addition to the SAD voids, there are related structures known as supra-arcade downflowing loops (SADLs). SADLs are retracting (shrinking) coronal loops that form as the overlying magnetic field is reconfigured during the flare. SADs and SADLs are thought to be manifestations of the same process viewed from different angles, such that SADLs are observed if the viewer's perspective is along the axis of the arcade (i.e. through the arch), while SADs are observed if the perspective is perpendicular to the arcade axis.

SADs observed by SDO, 131 Å on October 2, 2011.

=== Basic properties ===
SADs typically begin 100–200 Mm above the photosphere and descend 20–50 Mm before dissipating near the top of the flare arcade after a few minutes. Sunward speeds generally fall between 50 and 500 km s^{−1} but may occasionally approach 1000 km s^{−1}. As they fall, the downflows decelerate at rates of 0.1 to 2 km s^{−2}. SADs appear dark because they are considerably less dense than the surrounding plasma, while their temperatures (100,000 to 10,000,000 K) do not differ significantly from their surroundings. Their cross-sectional areas range from a few million to 70 million km^{2} (for comparison, the cross-sectional area of the Moon is 9.5 million km^{2}).

=== Instrumentation ===
SADs are typically observed using soft x-ray and extreme ultraviolet telescopes, or EUVs, that cover a wavelength range of roughly 10 to 1500 Å, and are sensitive to the coronal plasma, through which the downflows move. These emissions, however, are blocked by Earth's atmosphere, so observations are made using space observatories. The first detection was made in 1999 by a soft x-ray telescope (SXT) onboard the Yohkoh spacecraft, and was soon followed by observations from NASA’s TRACE satellite, and the spectroscopic SUMER instrument on board the SOHO Observatory. More recently, studies on SADs have used data from an SXT onboard the Hinode, as well as from the Solar Dynamics Observatory. In addition to EUV and X-ray instruments, SADs may also be seen by white light coronagraphs such as the Large Angle and Spectrometric Coronagraph onboard SOHO, though these observations are less common.

== Causes ==
SADs are widely accepted to be byproducts of magnetic reconnection, the physical process that drives solar flares by releasing energy stored in the Sun's magnetic field. Magnetic reconnection changes the local magnetic field surrounding the flare site from a higher-energy (non-potential, stressed) state to a lower-energy (potential) state. This process is facilitated by the development of a current sheet, often preceded by or similar to a coronal mass ejection. As the field is being reconfigured, newly formed magnetic field lines are swept away from the reconnection site, producing new flows both toward and away from the solar surface, respectively referred to as downflows and upflows. SADs are believed to have relation to reconnection downflows that disrupt the hot, dense plasma that collects above flare arcades, but precisely how SADs form is uncertain and is an area of active research.

SADs were first interpreted as cross sections of magnetic flux tubes, which comprise coronal loops, that retract down due to magnetic tension after being formed at the reconnection site. This interpretation was later revised to suggest that SADs are instead wakes behind much smaller SADLs, rather than cross sections of the flux tubes themselves. Another possibility, also related to reconnection outflows, is that SADs arise from an instability, such as Rayleigh-Taylor instability or a combination of the tearing mode and Kelvin-Helmholtz instabilities.
