= Nanoflare =

Type of episodic heating event

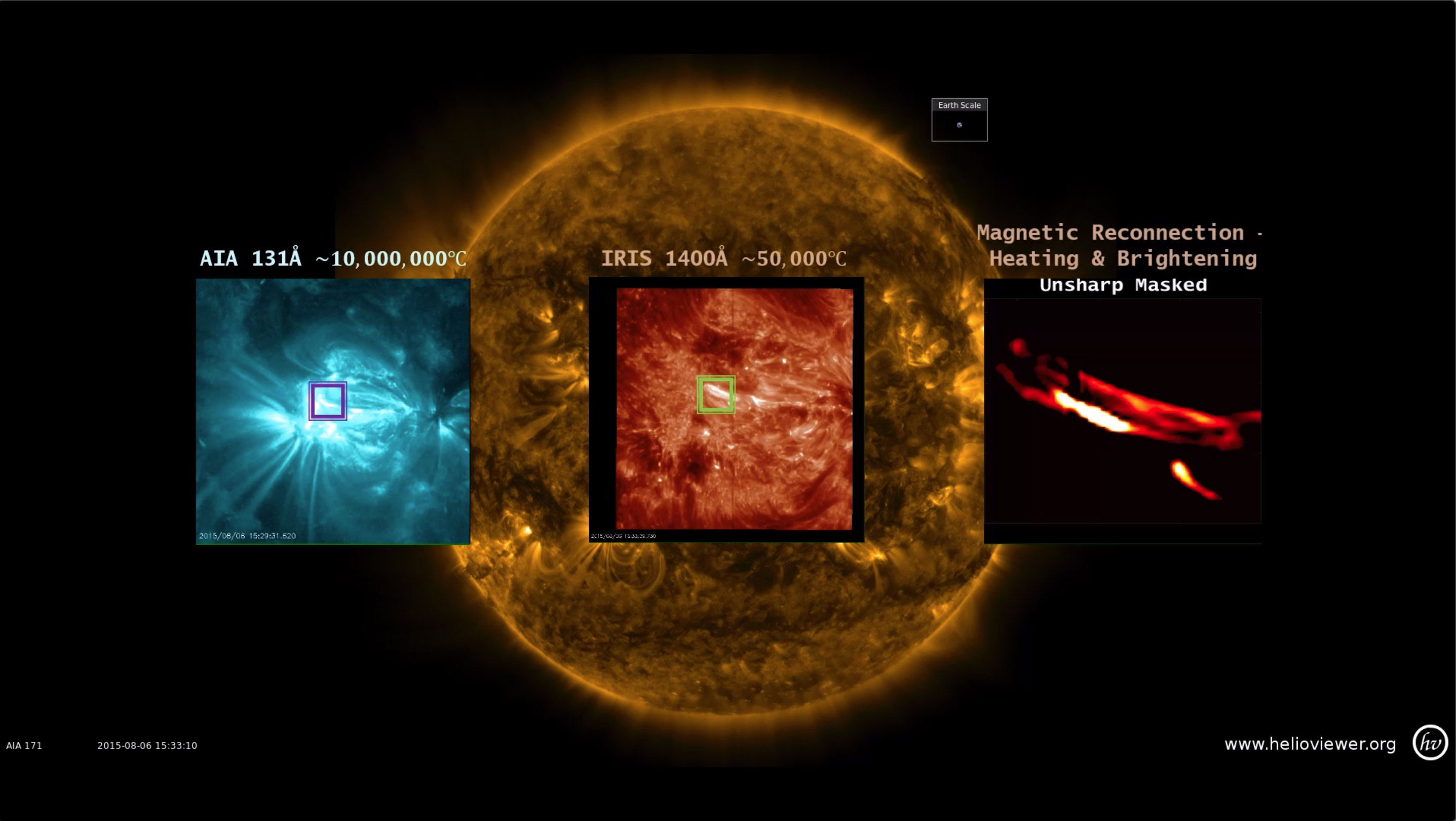
A close-up of one of the loop brightenings. The frame on the far right is the most zoomed in, showing the putative nanoflare.

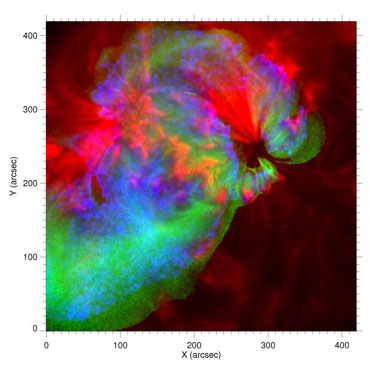
"This false-color temperature map shows solar active region AR10923, observed close to center of the sun's disk. Blue regions indicate plasma near 10 million degrees K." Credit: Reale, et al. (2009), NASA.

A nanoflare is a very small episodic heating event which could be prolific in the corona, the external atmosphere of the Sun. These would blend together to give the appearance of continuous heating.

The hypothesis of small impulsive heating events as a possible explanation of the coronal heating was first suggested by Thomas Gold and then later developed and dubbed "nanoflares" by Eugene Parker.

According to Parker, a nanoflare arises from an event of magnetic reconnection which converts the energy stored in the solar magnetic field into the motion of the plasma. The fluid plasma motion occurs at length-scales so small that it is soon damped by turbulence and then by viscosity. Damping quickly converts energy into heat, which is conducted by free electrons along the magnetic field lines closest to the place where the nanoflare switches on. In order to heat a region of very high X-ray emission, over an area of one square arcsec on the Sun, a nanoflare of 10^{17} J should happen every 20 seconds, and 1000 nanoflares per second should occur in a large active region of 10^{5} × 10^{5} km^{2}. On the basis of this theory, the emission coming from a big flare could be caused by a series of nanoflares, not observable individually.

The nanoflare model was proposed long before sensors were able to confirm it empirically. Simulations predict that nanoflares produce a faint, hot (~10 MK) component of the emission measure. As of 2012, then-current instruments, such as the Extreme-Ultraviolet Imaging Spectrometer on board Hinode, were not adequately sensitive to the range in which this faint emission occurs, making a confident detection impossible. Evidence published in 2014 from the EUNIS sounding rocket provided some spectral evidence for non-flaring plasma at temperatures near 9 MK in active region cores. Observation of the full life-cycle of a nanoflare was first reported in 2020.

== Nanoflares and coronal activity ==
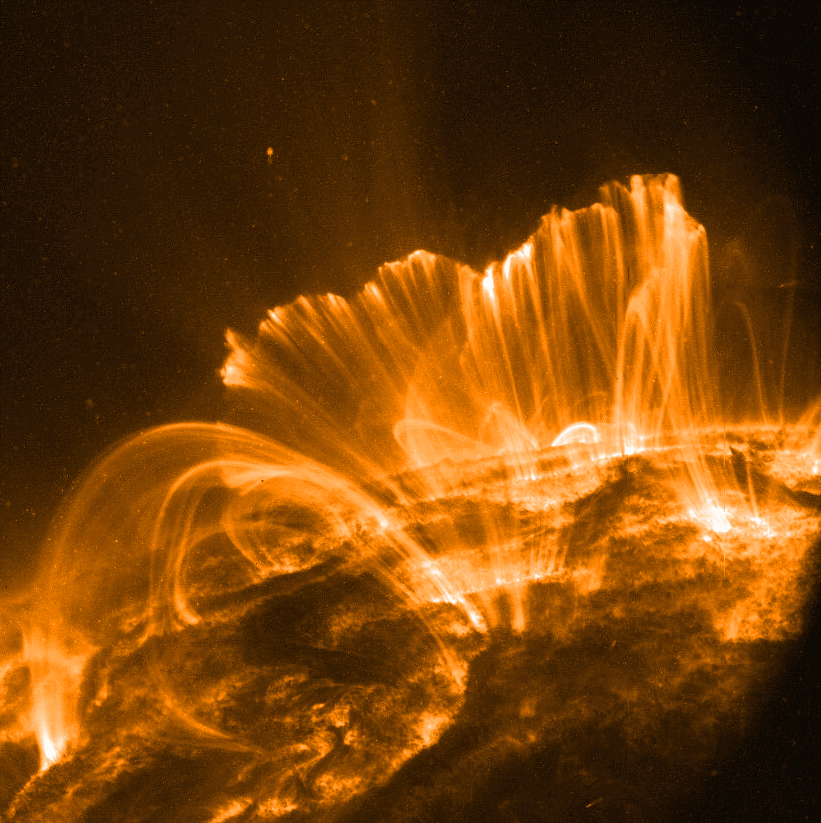
Typical flaring coronal loops observed by TRACE in the EUV rays

Telescopic observations suggest that the solar magnetic field, which theoretically is "frozen" into the gas of the plasma in the photosphere, expands into roughly semicircular structures in the corona. These coronal loops, which can be seen in the EUV and X-ray images (see the figure on the left), often confine very hot plasmas, with emissions characteristic of temperature of a one to a few million degrees.

Many flux tubes are relatively stable as seen in soft X-ray images, emitting at steady rate. However flickerings, brightenings, small explosions, bright points, flares and mass eruptions are observed very frequently, especially in active regions. These macroscopic signs of solar activity are considered by astrophysicists as the phenomenology related to events of relaxation of stressed magnetic fields, during which part of the energy they have stored is released ultimately into particle kinetic energy (heating); this could be via current dissipation, Joule effect, or any of several non-thermal plasma effects.

Theoretical work often appeals to the concept of magnetic reconnection to explain these outbursts. Rather than a single large-scale episode of such a process, though, modern thinking suggests that a multitude of small-scale versions reconnection, cascading together, might be a better description. The theory of nanoflares then supposes that these events of magnetic reconnection, occurring at nearly the same time on small length-scales wherever in the corona, are very numerous, each providing an imperceptibly small fraction of the total energy required in a macroscopic event. These nanoflares might themselves resemble very tiny flares, close one to each other, both in time and in space, effectively heating the corona and underlying many of the phenomena of solar magnetic activity.

Episodic heating often observed in active regions, including major events such as flares and coronal mass ejections could be provoked by cascade effects, similar to those described by the mathematical theories of catastrophes. In the hypothesis that the solar corona is in a state of self-organized criticality, the stressing of the magnetic field should be enhanced until a small perturbation switches on many small instabilities, happening together as it occurs in avalanches.

One of the experimental results often cited in supporting the nanoflare theory is the fact that the distribution of the number of flares observed in the hard X-rays is a function of their energy, following a power law with negative spectral index. A sufficiently large power-law index would allow the smallest events to dominate the total energy. In the energy range of normal flares, the index has a value of approximately -1.8. This falls short of the power-law index which would be required order to maintain the heating of the solar corona via the nanoflare hypothesis. A power-law index greater than -2 is required to maintain the temperature observed in the corona.

== Nanoflares and coronal heating ==
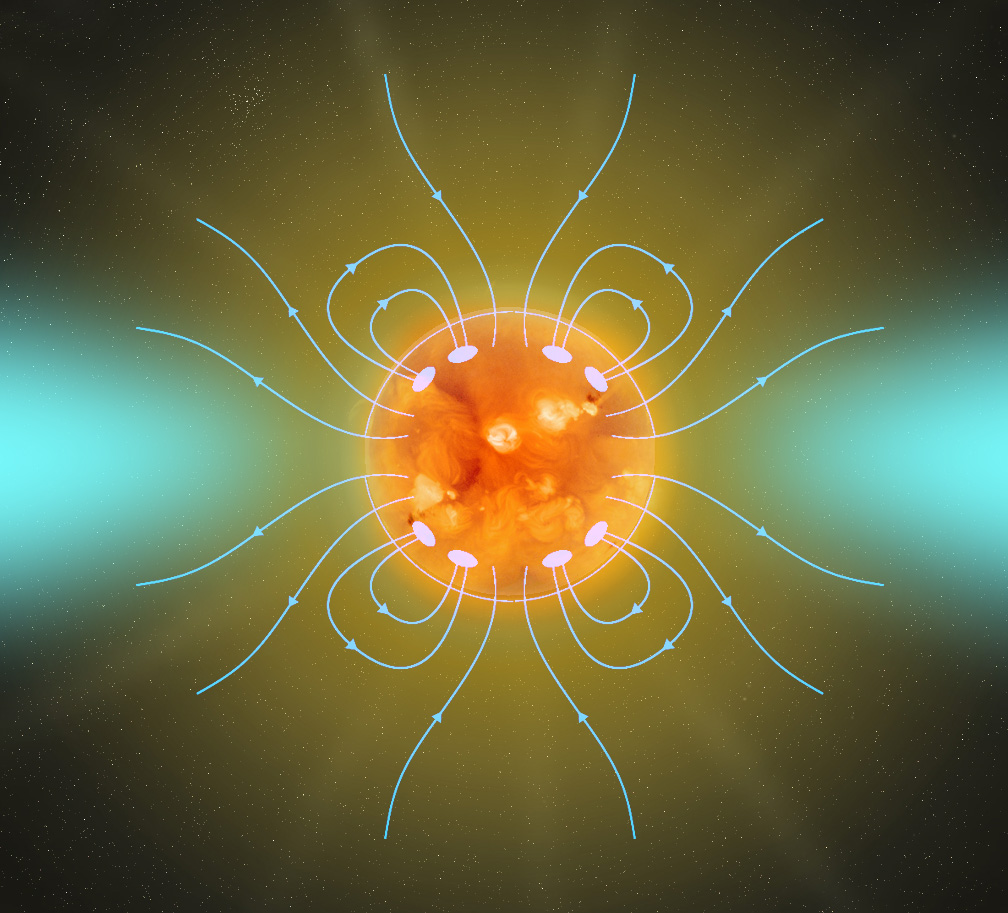
Solar Magnetic Field Lines

The problem of coronal heating is still unsolved, although research is ongoing and other evidence of nanoflares has been found in the solar corona. The amount of energy stored in the solar magnetic field can account for the coronal heating necessary to maintain the plasma at this temperature and to balance coronal radiative losses.

The radiation is not the only mechanism of energy loss in the corona: since the plasma is highly ionized and the magnetic field is well organized, the thermal conduction is a competitive process. The energy losses due to the thermal conduction are of the same order of coronal radiative losses. The energy released in the corona which is not radiated externally is conducted back towards the chromosphere along the arcs. In the transition region where the temperature is about 10^{4} -10^{5} K, radiative losses are too high to be balanced by any form of mechanical heating. The very high temperature gradient observed in this range of temperatures increases the conductive flux in order to supply for the irradiated power. In other words, the transition region is so steep (the temperature increases from 10 kK to 1 MK in a distance of the order of 100 km) because the thermal conduction from the superior hotter atmosphere must balance the high radiative losses, as indicated to the numerous emission lines, which are formed from ionized atoms (oxygen, carbon, iron and so on).

The solar convection can supply the required heating, but in a way not yet known in detail. Actually, it is still unclear how this energy is transmitted from the chromosphere(where it could be absorbed or reflected), and then dissipated into the corona instead of dispersing into the solar wind. Furthermore, where does it occur exactly? In the low corona or mainly in the higher corona, where the magnetic field lines open into the space heliosphere, driving the solar wind into the Solar System.

The importance of the magnetic field is recognized by all the scientists: there is a strict correspondence between the active regions, where the irradiated flux is higher (especially in the X-rays), and the regions of intense magnetic field.

The problem of coronal heating is complicated by the fact that different coronal features require very different amounts of energy. It is difficult to believe that very dynamic and energetic phenomena such as flares and coronal mass ejections share the same source of energy with stable structures covering very large areas on the Sun: if nanoflares would have heated the whole corona, then they should be distributed so uniformly so as to look like a steady heating. Flares themselves – and microflares, which when studied in detail seem to have the same physics – are highly intermittent in space and time, and would not therefore be relevant to any requirement for continuous heating. On the other hand, in order to explain very rapid and energetic phenomena such as solar flares, the magnetic field should be structured on distances of the order of the metre.

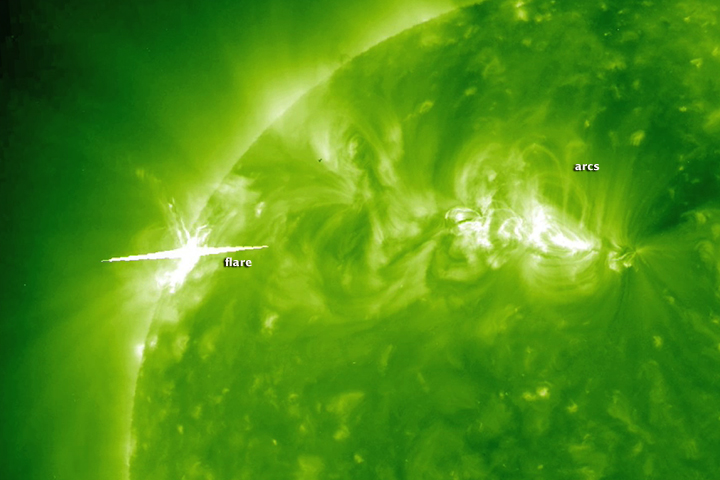
Solar Flare and Coronal Mass Ejection (STEREO)

The Alfvén waves generated by convective motions in the photosphere can go through the chromosphere and transition region, carrying an energy flux comparable to that required to sustain the corona. Anyway, wavetrain periods observed in the high chromosphere and in the lower transition region are of the order of 3-5 min. These times are longer than the time taken by Alfvén waves to cross a typical coronal loop. This means that most of the dissipative mechanisms may provide enough energy only at distances further from the solar corona. More probably, the Alfvén waves are responsible for the acceleration of the solar wind in coronal holes.

The theory initially developed by Parker of micro-nanoflares is one of those explaining the heating of the corona as the dissipation of electric currents generated by a spontaneous relaxation of the magnetic field towards a configuration of lower energy. The magnetic energy is thus transformed into Joule heating. The braiding of the field lines of the coronal magnetic flux tubes provokes events of magnetic reconnection with a consequent change of the magnetic field at small length-scales without a simultaneous alteration of the magnetic field lines at large length-scales. In this way it can be explained why coronal loops are stable and so hot at the same time.

The Ohmic dissipation by currents could be a valid alternative to explain the coronal activity. For many years the magnetic reconnection has been invoked as the main power source of solar flares. However this heating mechanism is not very efficient in large current sheets, while more energy is released in turbulent regimes when nanoflares happen at much smaller scale-lengths, where non-linear effects are not negligible.

The complete lifecycle of a nanoflare has been reported. The researchers documented the process of selective ion heating via magnetic reconnection within low-lying, previously unresolved solar coronal loops. These loops were observed to undergo rapid heating from temperatures of a few thousand degrees Celsius to several million degrees within a span of tens of seconds, followed by a gradual cooldown, delivering enough energy to heat the corona to multi-million degree Celsius.

== See also ==
- Chromosphere
- Stellar corona
- Coronal cloud
- Coronal loops
- Coronal mass ejection
- Coronal radiative losses
- Current sheet
- Magnetic reconnection
- Neupert effect
- Photosphere
- Plasma physics
- Solar flare
- Solar transition region
- Solar wind
- Sun
- Sunspot
- X-ray astronomy
