= AZ Cancri =

Star in the constellation Cancer

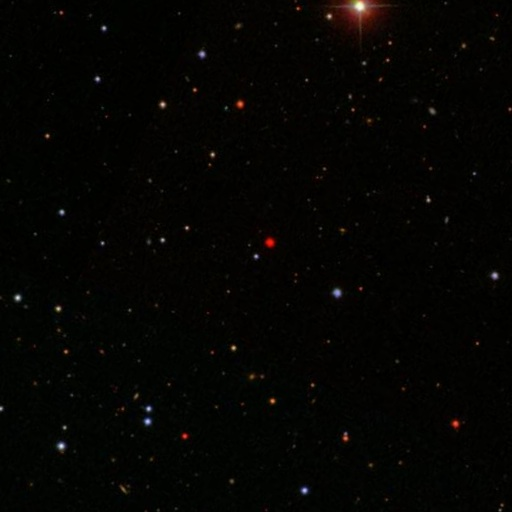
- Image of AZ Cancri from the Sloan Digital Sky Survey; it is the red star close to the centre.

Observation data Epoch J2000.0 Equinox J2000.0 (ICRS)
- Constellation: Cancer
- Right ascension: 08^{h} 40^{m} 29.679^{s}
- Declination: +18° 24′ 08.73″
- Apparent magnitude (V): 17.59

Characteristics
- Spectral type: M6.5eV
- B−V color index: 1.6
- V−R color index: 1.0
- R−I color index: 3.2
- Variable type: UV

Astrometry
Proper motion (μ)	RA: −809.817 mas/yr Dec.: −448.969 mas/yr
Parallax (π)	73.8573±0.0671 mas
Distance	44.16 ± 0.04 ly (13.54 ± 0.01 pc)
Absolute magnitude (M_{V})	16.85

Details
Mass	0.10 M_{☉}
Radius	0.13 R_{☉}
Luminosity	0.015 L_{☉}
Surface gravity (log g)	5.24 cgs
Temperature	2,825 K
Metallicity [Fe/H]	+0.27 dex
Age	100 Myr

Other designations
- AZ Cnc, GJ 316.1, LHS 2034, NLTT 20016

Database references
SIMBAD	data

AZ Cancri (AZ Cnc) is a M-type flare star in the constellation Cancer. It has an apparent visual magnitude of approximately 17.59.

== Observations ==
AZ Cancri is a member of the Beehive Cluster, also known as Praesepe or NGC 2632. The spectral type of AZ Cnc is M6e, specifically M6.5Ve, and was catalogued as a flare star by Haro and Chavira in 1964 (called by them T4). AZ Cnc has also been found to be an x-ray source, with the ROSAT designations of RX J0840.4+1824 and 1RXS J084029.9+182417. The X-ray luminosity has been found to be 27.40 ergs/s

== Physical characteristics ==
The absolute magnitude of the star has been found to be 16.9, and thus its luminosity is approximately 3.020 × 10^{30} ergs/s.

AZ Cancri is located approximately 14.0 parsecs (46 ly) from the Sun, and is considered a very low-mass star with a radial velocity of 64.2±0.6 km/s. AZ Cancri belongs kinematically to the old disk. It is rotating at approximately 7.9±2.8 km/s.

== Flaring ==
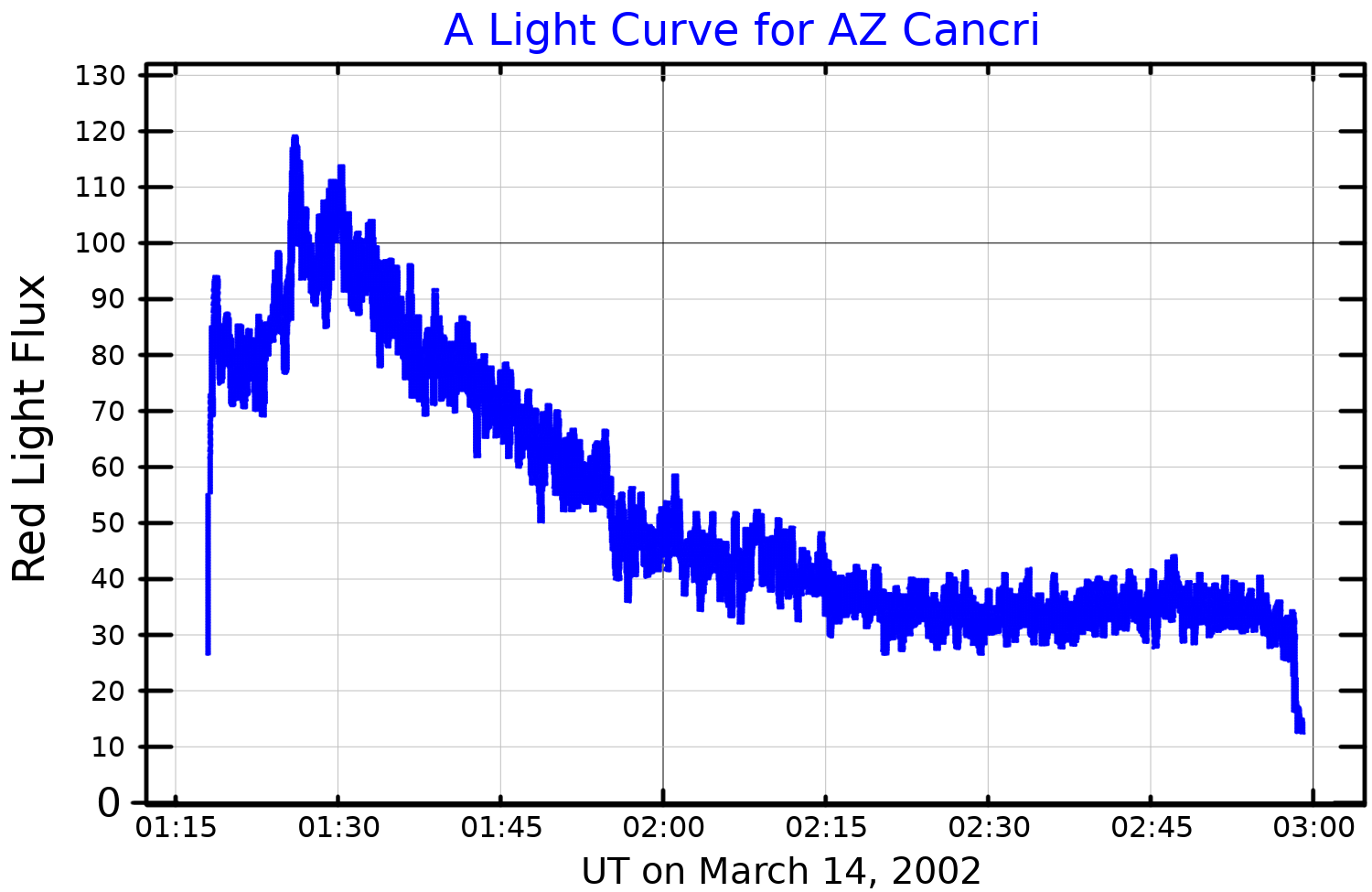
A red band light curve for a flare on AZ Cancri, adapted from Fuhrmeister et al. (2005)

The X-ray luminosity of AZ Cnc increased by at least two orders of magnitude during a flare that lasted more than 3 hours and reached a peak emission level of more than 10^{29} ergs/s. During another long duration flare (March 14, 2002) on AZ Cnc, very strong wing asymmetries occurred in all lines of the Balmer series and all strong He I lines, but not in the metal lines.

The flaring atmosphere of AZ Cancri has been analysed with a stellar atmosphere model, and was found to consist of

1. an underlying photosphere,
2. a linear temperature rise vs. log column mass in the chromosphere, and
3. transition region (TR) with different gradients.

For the underlying photosphere, the effective temperature was found to be 2825 K, and a solar chemical composition was used. The last spectrum taken in the series after the flare was used for the quiescent chromosphere.

The line asymmetries have been attributed to downward moving material, specifically a series of flare-triggered downward moving chromospheric condensations, or chromospheric downward condensations (CDC)s as on the Sun.

== Theory of coronal heating ==
The electrodynamic coupling theory of coronal heating developed in a solar context, has been applied to stellar corona. A distinctive feature is the occurrence of a resonance between the convective turnover time and the crossing time for Alfvén waves in a coronal loop. The resonance attains a maximum among the early M dwarf spectral types and declines thereafter. A turnover in coronal heating efficiency, presumably manifested by a decrease in L_{x}/L_{bol}, becomes evident toward the late M spectral types when the theory is applicable. This is consistent with an apparent lack of X-ray emission among the late M dwarfs. Coronal heating efficiencies do not decrease toward the presumably totally convective stars near the end of the main sequence. For "saturated" M dwarfs, 0.1% of all energy is typically radiated in X-rays, while for AZ Cnc this number increases during flaring to 7%. So far there is no evidence to suggest that AZ Cnc is less efficient than more massive dwarfs in creating a corona. The saturation boundary in X-ray luminosity extends to late M dwarfs, with L_{x}/L_{bol} ~ 10^{−3} for saturated dwarfs outside flaring. No coronal dividing line exists in the Hertzsprung–Russell diagram at the low-mass end of the main sequence.

AZ Cnc casts doubt on the applicability of electrodynamic coupling as there is no evidence for a sharp drop in L_{x}/L_{bol} when compared with other late M stars at least until subtype M8.

== Dynamo ==
AZ Cnc has a corona and this may indicate that a distributive dynamo is just as efficient in producing magnetic flux as a shell dynamo. Between the generation of a magnetic field and the emission of X-rays lies the coronal heating mechanism.
