= Solar corona =

Outermost layer of the Sun's atmosphere

During a total solar eclipse, the Sun's corona and prominences are visible to the naked eye.

The solar corona is the outermost layer of the Sun's atmosphere. It is a region filled with relatively hot, tenuous plasma that is structured by the solar magnetic field.

The solar corona lies above the photosphere and chromosphere and extends out to the edge of the solar atmosphere where it merges with the solar wind. The chromosphere and corona are separated by a thin, highly dynamic transition region. The outer edge of solar atmosphere where the corona transitions into the solar wind is defined by the Alfvén surface which forms an irregularly shaped boundary around the Sun at heights ranging from about 10 to 20 solar radii (7000000 to 14000000 km) above the photosphere.

Coronal light is typically obscured by diffuse sky radiation and glare from the solar disk, but can be easily seen by the naked eye when the sun is completely or totally blocked in a solar eclipse, or with a specialized coronagraph. Spectroscopic measurements indicate strong ionization in the corona and a plasma temperature in excess of 1000000 kelvins, much hotter than the surface of the Sun.

The solar corona is populated by structures such as prominences, coronal loops, and helmet streamers.

== Observational history ==
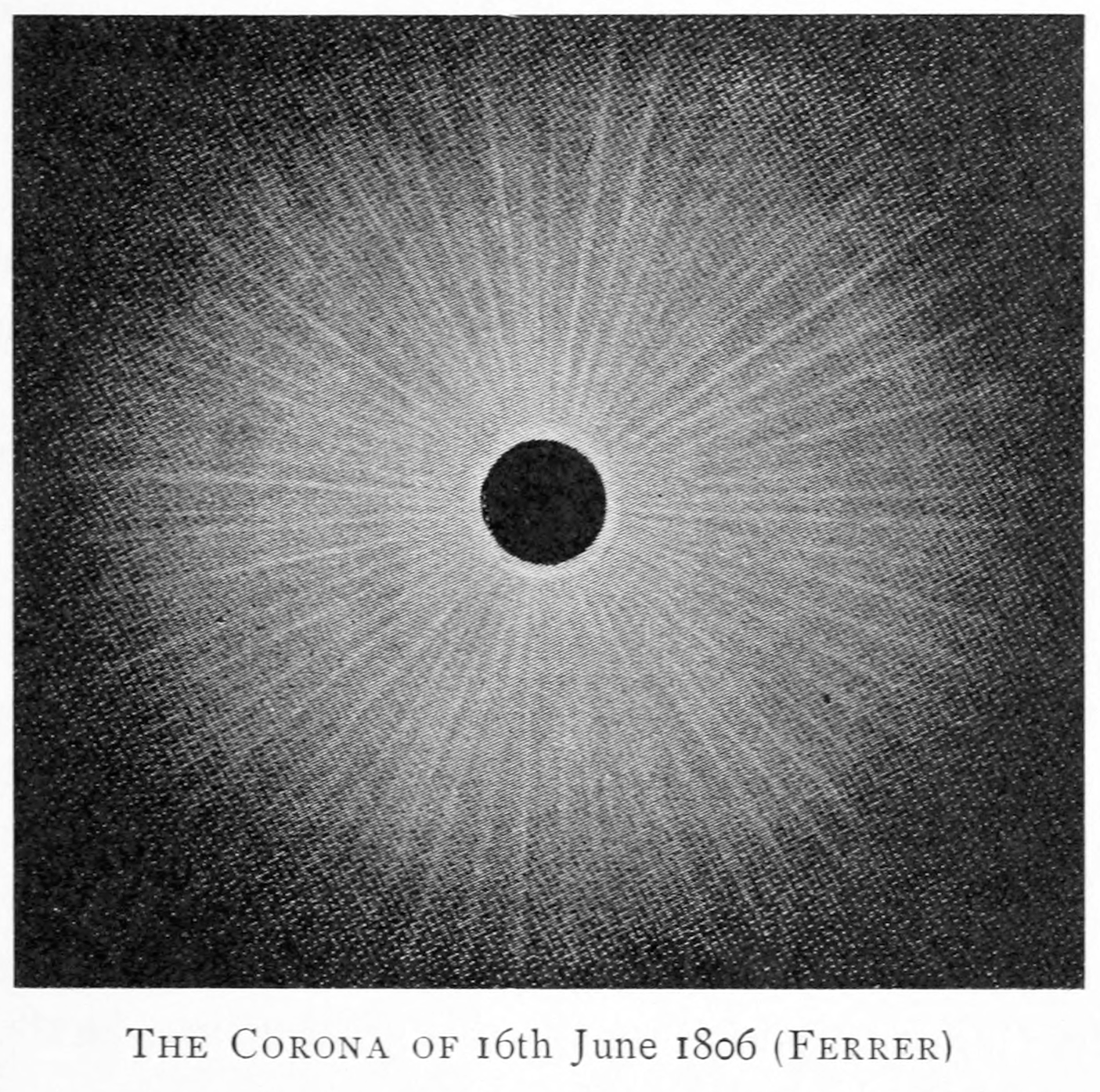
Corona sketched by José Joaquín de Ferrer during the solar eclipse of June 16, 1806 in Kinderhook, New York.

In 1724, French-Italian astronomer Giacomo F. Maraldi recognized that the aura visible during a solar eclipse belongs to the Sun, not to the Moon. In 1809, Spanish astronomer José Joaquín de Ferrer published his own observations of the solar eclipse that happened three years earlier at Kinderhook, New York and also proposed that the corona was part of the Sun and not of the Moon; his reports is where the term 'corona' first appears coined by himself.

English astronomer Norman Lockyer identified the first element unknown on Earth in the Sun's chromosphere, which was called helium (from Greek helios 'sun'). French astronomer Jules Jenssen noted, after comparing his readings between the 1871 and 1878 eclipses, that the size and shape of the corona changes with the sunspot cycle. In 1930, Bernard Lyot invented the "coronograph" (now "coronagraph"), which allows viewing the corona without a total eclipse. In 1952, American astronomer Eugene Parker proposed that the solar corona might be heated by myriad tiny nanoflares, miniature brightenings resembling solar flares that would occur all over the surface of the Sun.

The high temperature of the Sun's corona gives it unusual spectral features, which led some in the 19th century to suggest that it contained a previously unknown element, "coronium". Instead, these spectral features have since been explained by highly ionized iron (Fe-XIV, or Fe^{13+}). Bengt Edlén, following the work of Walter Grotrian in 1939, first identified the coronal spectral lines in 1940 (observed since 1869) as transitions from low-lying metastable levels of the ground configuration of highly ionised metals (the green Fe-XIV line from Fe^{13+} at 5303Å, but also the red Fe-X line from Fe^{9+} at 6374Å).

== General characteristics ==
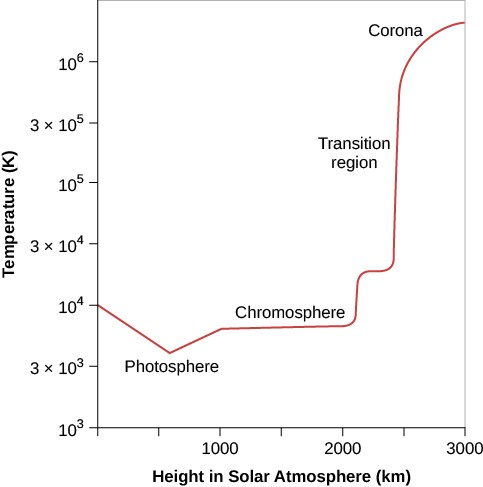
Temperatures in the solar atmosphere rise precipitously with height in the transition region between the chromosphere and corona.

Energy generated by nuclear fusion in the Sun's core heats the overlying interior and atmospheric layers as it is transferred outward. Temperatures in the interior decrease with increasing distance from the core and reach a minimum of 4400 K (kelvin) at the top of the photosphere, the Sun's surface layer. In the atmospheric layers above the photosphere, this trend reverses, and temperatures begin to increase with increasing altitude. This increase is most extreme at the top of the chromosphere—about 1600 km above the photosphere—where there is an irregular, approximately 100 km-thick transition region across which temperatures rise from about 20000 K to more than 1000000 K with a corresponding increase in ionization and decrease in density. The hot, tenuous layer above this transition region is the corona, the outermost layer of the solar atmosphere.

Temperatures in the corona typically range from 1000000 to 2000000 K but can reach as high as 20000000 K in some active regions. The coronal plasma at these temperatures is almost completely ionized and highly rarefied. The particle number density is 10^{15} particles per m^{3} at the base of the corona and generally decreases further with altitude due to gravitational stratification. These densities are low enough that collisions between particles are extremely rare, and the plasma is nearly collisionless.

The elemental composition of the corona is not uniform and varies between different coronal features. Compared to the uniform composition of the underlying photosphere, the coronal plasma generally has an overabundance of elements with low first ionization potential.

The solar magnetic field permeates the entire corona and influences the structure and dynamics of the coronal plasma. Charged particles in a magnetic field will be forced to spiral around the magnetic field lines and will not cross them except when scattered by collisions with other particles. As a result, the nearly collisionless coronal plasma only flows along the coronal field; closed field lines that start and end in the photosphere but project into the corona, such as in coronal loops, will confine the coronal plasma, while open field lines that reach interplanetary space, such as in coronal holes, will allow the coronal plasma to escape into the solar wind.

=== Radiation ===
Electromagnetic radiation is emitted, scattered, and absorbed by plasma and dust particles in the corona. Because of its low density, the corona is transparent to most wavelengths, and the majority of the radiation emitted in the corona, chromosphere, and photosphere can pass through without being scattered or absorbed. However, the small fraction of light from the photosphere that does get scattered forms the bulk of the total radiation from the corona in the visible range. Light scattered in the corona is typically divided into two components based on the scattering mechanism.

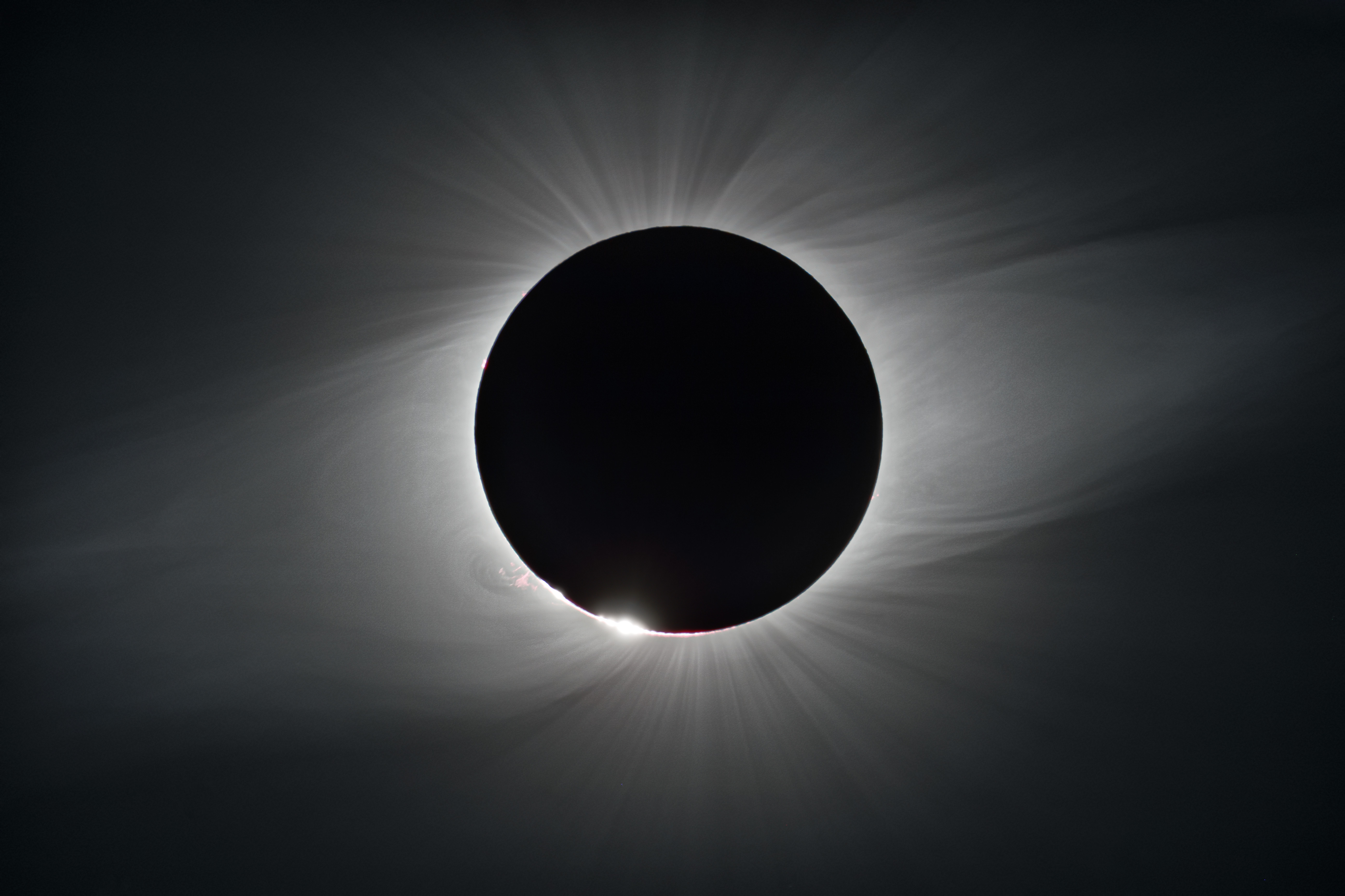
The light visible close to the Sun during a total solar eclipse originates primarily from the K-corona.

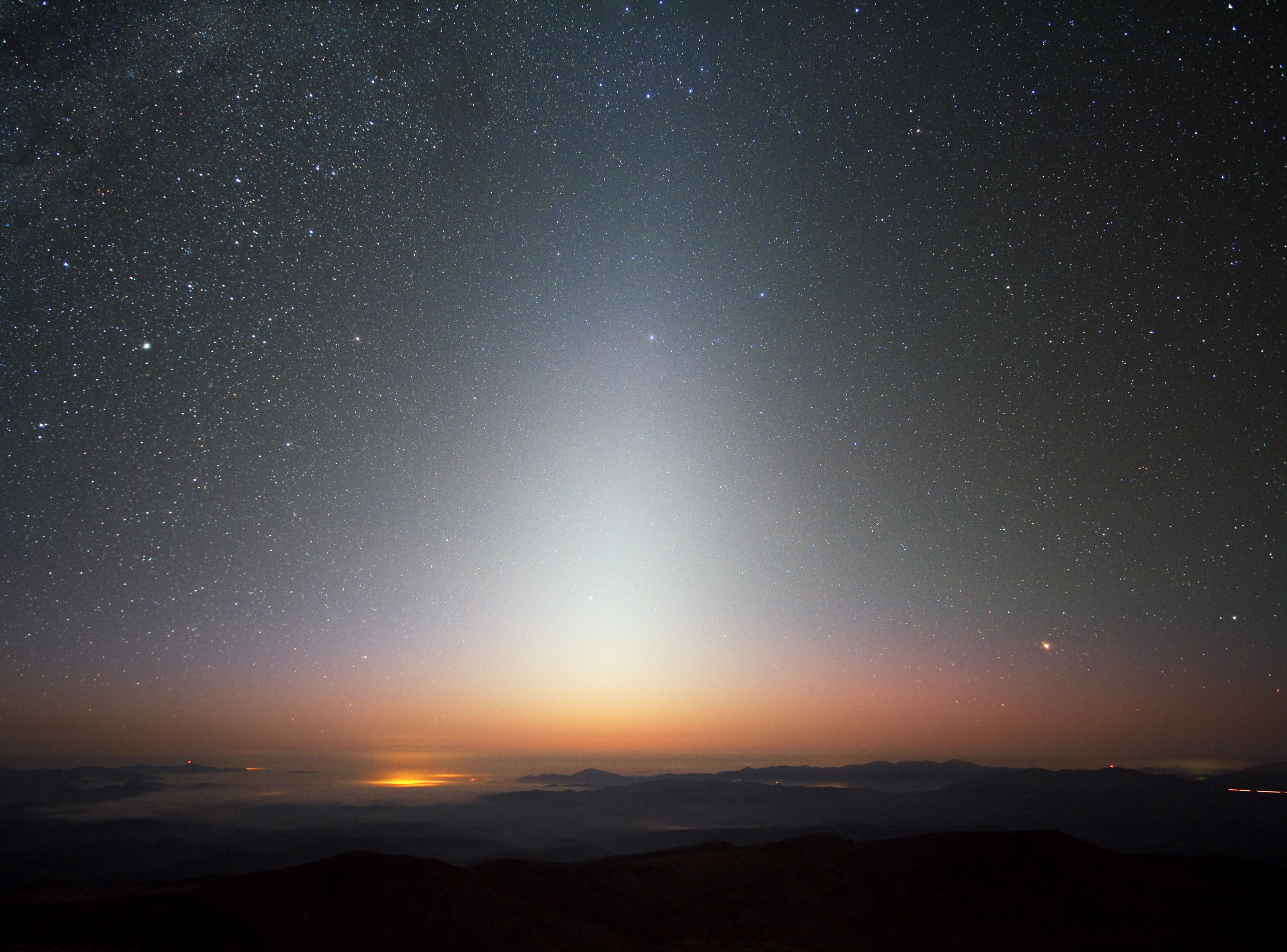
The zodiacal light from sunlight scattered by interplanetary dust merges with the F-corona close to the Sun.

- The K-corona (K for kontinuierlich, "continuous" in German) is from photospheric light Thomson scattering off free electrons in the corona. Doppler broadening of the scattered photospheric absorption lines spreads them so greatly as to completely obscure them, giving the spectral appearance of a continuum with no absorption lines.
- The F-corona (F for Fraunhofer) is from photospheric light scattering off dust particles located beyond about one solar radius above the photosphere. These dust particles are much slower than the electrons, so Doppler broadening is negligible. As a result, the Fraunhofer absorption lines observed in the photospheric spectrum are also observed in the F-corona spectrum. The F-corona extends to very high elongation angles from the Sun and merges with the zodiacal light.

This white-light component of the coronal radiation is extremely faint relative to the photosphere. The maximum brightness ratio between the photosphere and the corona just above the visible limb is on the order of 10^{−6} and decreases to 10^{−9} within a solar diameter from the limb. Furthermore, the sky brightness can be more than three to five orders of magnitude larger than the coronal brightness, rendering the corona unobservable to the naked eye without a total solar eclipse.

A small portion of the total visible light from the corona also originates from spectral lines emitted by ions in the hot, rarefied coronal plasma. The coronal spectral lines emitted from across the electromagnetic spectrum collectively form the E-corona (E for emission). In the visible range, the integrated light from the continuous K- and F-corona far exceed that from the E-corona, but the isolated emission lines are strong relative to the continuous background and can be observed with narrow-band filters. Many of the E-corona emission lines are produced by forbidden transitions from metastable energy levels.

The corona also emits radiation in the radio, infrared, extreme ultraviolet, and X-ray ranges.

== Structure ==
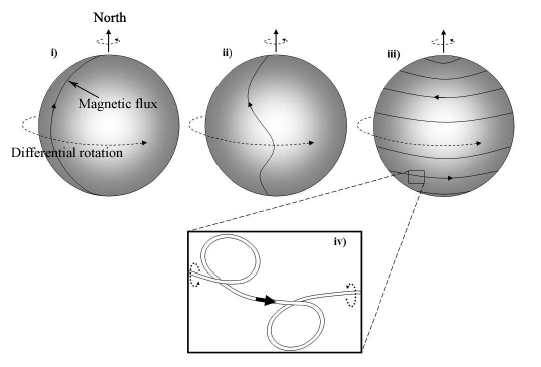
Configuration of solar magnetic flux during the solar cycle

The upwelling of the solar magnetic field from the action of the solar dynamo constantly changes the structure of the solar corona. The corona is not always evenly distributed across the surface of the Sun. During periods of quiet, the corona is more or less confined to the equatorial regions, with coronal holes covering the polar regions. However, during the Sun's active periods, the corona is evenly distributed over the equatorial and polar regions, though it is most prominent in areas with sunspot activity. The solar cycle spans approximately 11 years, from one solar minimum to the following minimum. Since the solar magnetic field is continually wound up due to the faster rotation of mass at the Sun's equator (differential rotation), sunspot activity is more pronounced at solar maximum where the magnetic field is more twisted. Associated with sunspots are coronal loops, loops of magnetic flux, upwelling from the solar interior. The magnetic flux pushes the hotter photosphere aside, exposing the cooler plasma below, thus creating the relatively dark sun spots.

High-resolution X-ray images of the Sun's corona photographed by Skylab in 1973, by Yohkoh in 1991–2001, and by subsequent space-based instruments revealed the structure of the corona to be quite varied and complex, leading astronomers to classify various zones on the coronal disc. Astronomers usually distinguish several regions, as described below.

=== Coronal loops ===
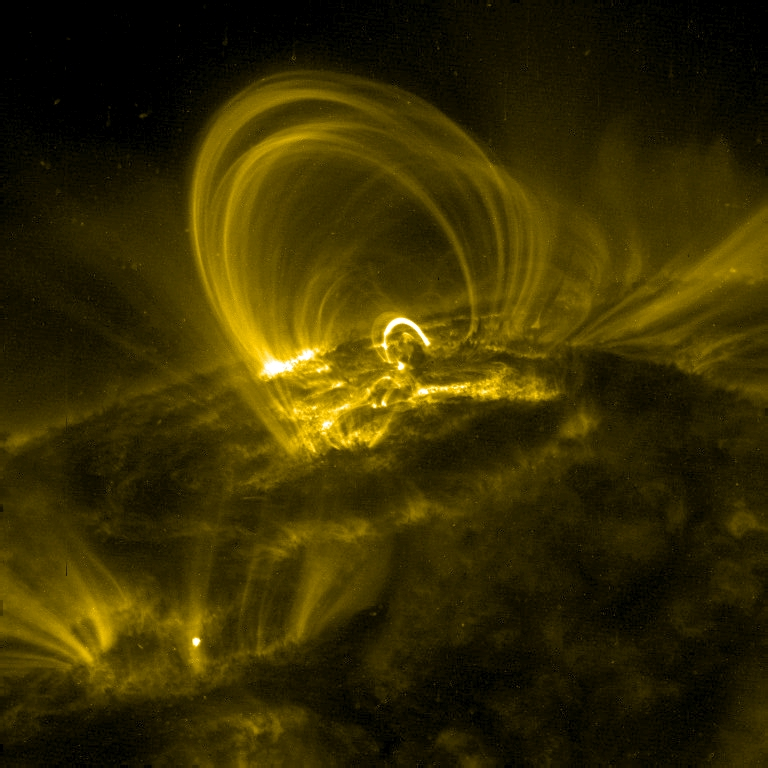
Coronal loops rooted in an active region. Imaged in 171 Å by TRACE.

Coronal loops are the basic structures of the magnetic solar corona. These loops are the closed-magnetic flux cousins of the open-magnetic flux that can be found in coronal holes and the solar wind. Loops of magnetic flux well up from the solar body and fill with hot solar plasma.

The solar plasma that feeds these structures is heated from under 6000K to well over 10^{6} K from the photosphere, through the transition region, and into the corona. Often, the solar plasma will fill these loops from one point and drain to another, called foot points (siphon flow due to a pressure difference, or asymmetric flow due to some other driver).

When the plasma rises from the foot points towards the loop top, as always occurs during the initial phase of a compact flare, it is defined as chromospheric evaporation. When the plasma rapidly cools and falls toward the photosphere, it is called chromospheric condensation. There may also be symmetric flow from both loop foot points, causing a build-up of mass in the loop structure. The plasma may cool rapidly in this region (for a thermal instability), its dark filaments obvious against the solar disk or prominences off the Sun's limb.

Coronal loops may have lifetimes in the order of seconds (in the case of flare events), minutes, hours or days. Where there is a balance in loop energy sources and sinks, coronal loops can last for long periods of time and are known as steady state or quiescent coronal loops (example).

Coronal loops are very important to our understanding of the current coronal heating problem. Coronal loops are highly radiating sources of plasma and are therefore easy to observe by instruments such as TRACE. An explanation of the coronal heating problem remains as these structures are being observed remotely, where many ambiguities are present (i.e., radiation contributions along the line-of-sight propagation). In-situ measurements are required before a definitive answer can be determined, but due to the high plasma temperatures in the corona, in-situ measurements are, at present, impossible. NASA's Parker Solar Probe approaches the Sun very closely, allowing more direct observations.

=== Active regions ===
Active regions are ensembles of loop structures connecting points of opposite magnetic polarity in the photosphere, the so-called coronal loops. They generally distribute in two zones of activity, which are parallel to the solar equator. The average temperature is between two and four million kelvin, while the density goes from 10^{9} to 10^{10} particles per cubic centimetre.

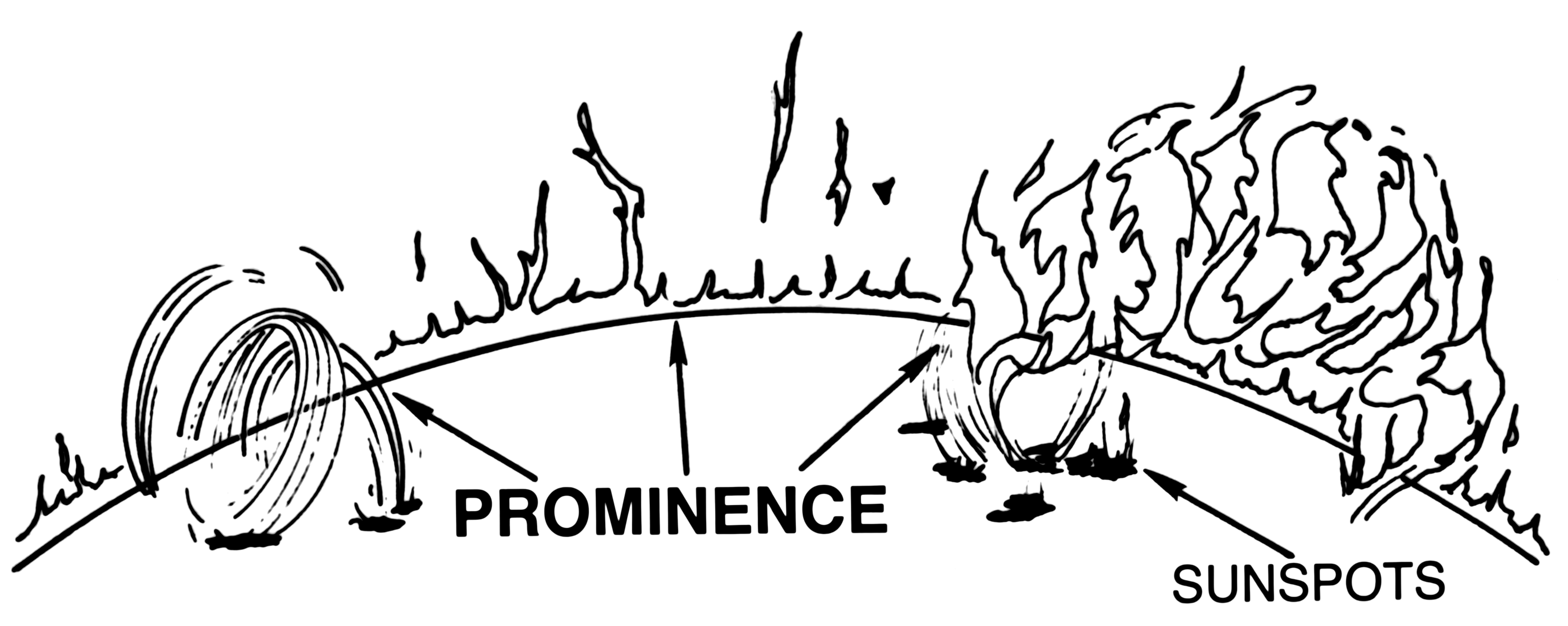
Solar prominences and sunspots

Active regions involve all the phenomena directly linked to the magnetic field, which occur at different heights above the Sun's surface: sunspots and faculae occur in the photosphere; spicules, Hα filaments and plages in the chromosphere; prominences in the chromosphere and transition region; and flares and coronal mass ejections (CME) happen in the corona and chromosphere. If flares are very violent, they can also perturb the photosphere and generate a Moreton wave. On the contrary, quiescent prominences are large, cool, dense structures which are observed as dark, "snake-like" Hα ribbons (appearing like filaments) on the solar disc. Their temperature is about 5000–8000K, and so they are usually considered as chromospheric features.

In 2013, images from the High Resolution Coronal Imager revealed never-before-seen "magnetic braids" of plasma within the outer layers of these active regions.

=== Helmet streamers ===
As Parker Solar Probe passed through the Sun's corona in early 2021, the spacecraft flew by structures called coronal streamers.

Helmet streamers are large, cap-like coronal structures with long, pointed peaks that usually overlie sunspots and active regions. Coronal streamers are considered to be sources of the slow solar wind.

=== Bright points ===
Bright points are small active regions found on the solar disk. X-ray bright points were first detected on April 8, 1969, during a rocket flight.

The fraction of the solar surface covered by bright points varies with the solar cycle. They are associated with small bipolar regions of the magnetic field. Their average temperature ranges from 1.1 MK to 3.4 MK. The variations in temperature are often correlated with changes in the X-ray emission.

=== Coronal holes ===
Coronal holes are unipolar regions which look dark in the X-rays since they do not emit much radiation. These are wide zones of the Sun where the magnetic field is unipolar and opens towards the interplanetary space. The high speed solar wind arises mainly from these regions.

In the UV images of the coronal holes, some small structures, similar to elongated bubbles, are often seen as they were suspended in the solar wind. These are the coronal plumes. More precisely, they are long thin streamers that project outward from the Sun's north and south poles.

=== The quiet Sun ===
The solar regions which are not part of active regions and coronal holes are commonly identified as the quiet Sun.

The equatorial region has a faster rotation speed than the polar zones. The result of the Sun's differential rotation is that the active regions always arise in two bands parallel to the equator and their extension increases during the periods of maximum of the solar cycle, while they almost disappear during each minimum. Therefore, the quiet Sun always coincides with the equatorial zone and its surface is less active during the maximum of the solar cycle. Approaching the minimum of the solar cycle (also named butterfly cycle), the extension of the quiet Sun increases until it covers the whole disk surface excluding some bright points on the hemisphere and the poles, where there are coronal holes.

=== Alfvén surface ===
NASA animation of the Parker Solar Probe passing through the Sun's corona. Inside the corona's boundary, its Alfvén surface, plasma waves travel back and forth to the Sun's surface.

The Alfvén surface is the boundary separating the corona from the solar wind defined as where the coronal plasma's Alfvén speed and the large-scale solar wind speed are equal.

Researchers were unsure exactly where the Alfvén critical surface of the Sun lay. Based on remote images of the corona, estimates had put it somewhere between 10 and 20 solar radii from the surface of the Sun. On April 28, 2021, during its eighth flyby of the Sun, NASA's Parker Solar Probe encountered the specific magnetic and particle conditions at 18.8 solar radii that indicated that it penetrated the Alfvén surface.

== Variability ==
A portrait, as diversified as the one already pointed out for the coronal features, is emphasized by the analysis of the dynamics of the main structures of the corona, which evolve at differential times. Studying coronal variability in its complexity is not easy because the times of evolution of the different structures can vary considerably: from seconds to several months. The typical sizes of the regions where coronal events take place vary in the same way, as it is shown in the following table.

Coronal event	Typical time-scale	Typical length-scale (Mm)
Active region flare	10 to 10000seconds	10–100
X-ray bright point	minutes	1–10
Transient in large-scale structures	from minutes to hours	~100
Transient in interconnecting arcs	from minutes to hours	~100
Quiet Sun	from hours to months	100–1000
Coronal hole	several rotations	100–1000

=== Flares ===
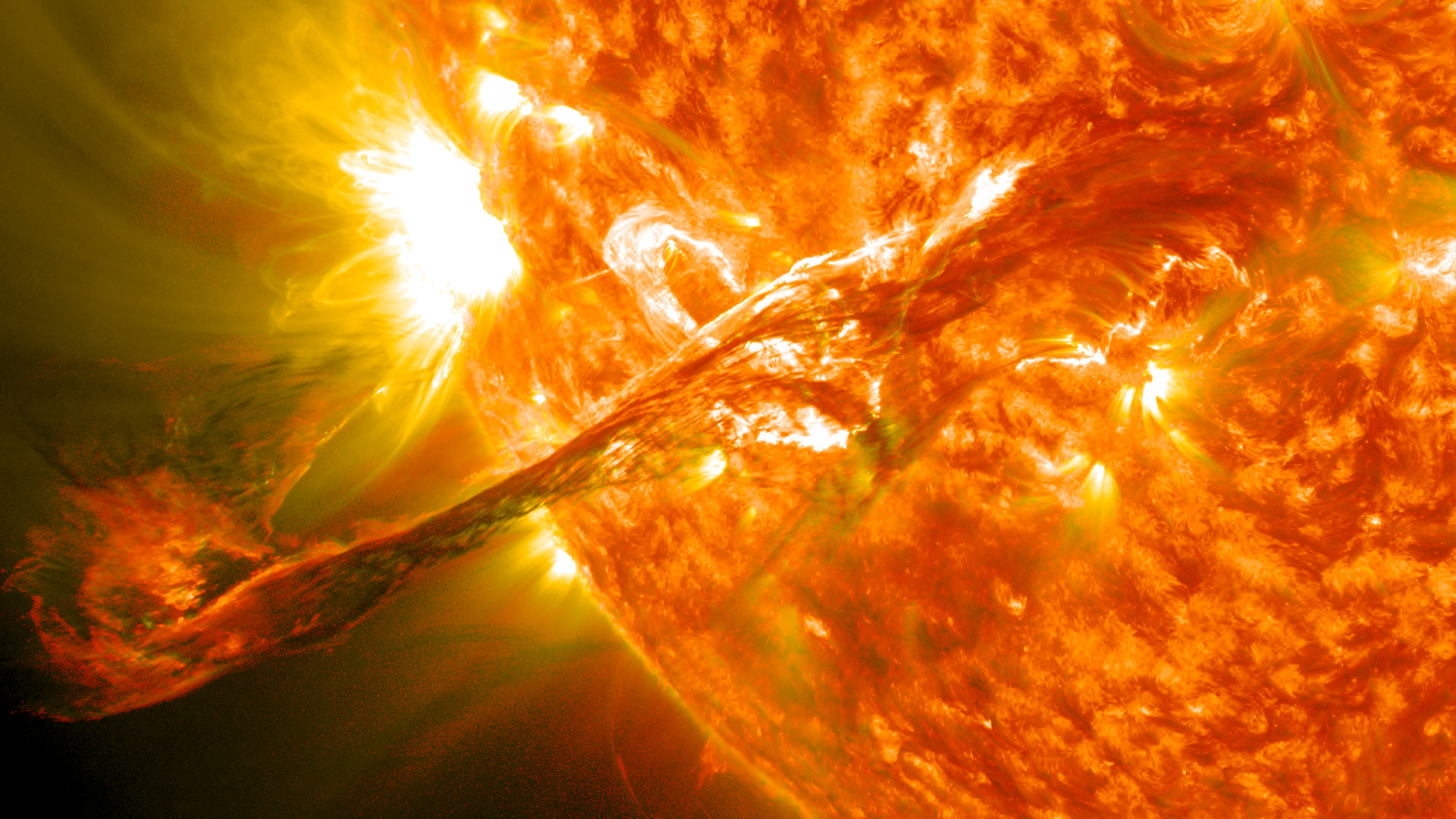
On August 31, 2012, a long filament of solar material that had been hovering in the corona erupted

Flares take place in active regions and are characterized by a sudden increase of the radiative flux emitted from small regions of the corona. They are very complex phenomena, visible at different wavelengths; they involve several zones of the solar atmosphere and many physical effects, thermal and not thermal, and sometimes wide reconnections of the magnetic field lines with material expulsion.

Flares are impulsive phenomena, of average duration of 15 minutes, and the most energetic events can last several hours. Flares produce a high and rapid increase of the density and temperature.

An emission in white light is only seldom observed: usually, flares are only seen at extreme UV wavelengths and into the X-rays, typical of the chromospheric and coronal emission.

In the corona, the morphology of flares is described by observations in the UV, soft and hard X-rays, and in Hα wavelengths, and is very complex. However, two kinds of basic structures can be distinguished:

- Compact flares, when each of the two arches where the event is happening maintains its morphology: only an increase of the emission is observed without significant structural variations. The emitted energy is of the order of 10^{22} – 10^{23} J.
- Flares of long duration, associated with eruptions of prominences, transients in white light and two-ribbon flares: in this case the magnetic loops change their configuration during the event. The energies emitted during these flares are of such great proportion they can reach 10^{25} J.

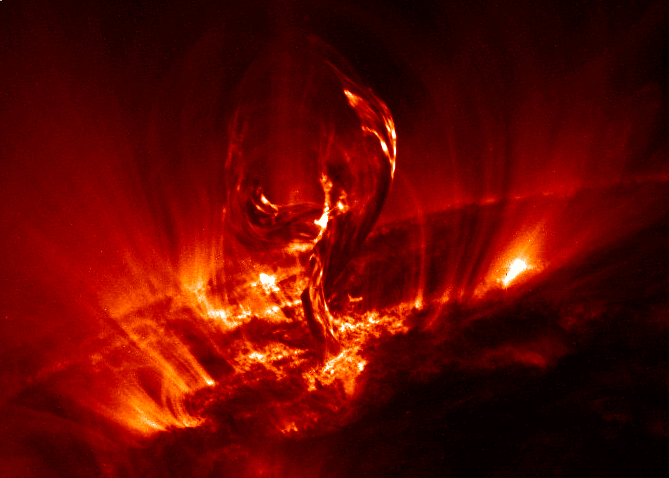
Filament erupting during a solar flare, seen at EUV wavelengths (TRACE)

As for temporal dynamics, three different phases are generally distinguished, whose duration are not comparable. The durations of those periods depend on the range of wavelengths used to observe the event:

- An initial impulsive phase, whose duration is on the order of minutes, strong emissions of energy are often observed even in the microwaves, EUV wavelengths and in the hard X-ray frequencies.
- A maximum phase
- A decay phase, which can last several hours.

Sometimes also a phase preceding the flare can be observed, usually called as "pre-flare" phase.

=== Coronal mass ejections ===
Often accompanying large solar flares and prominences are coronal mass ejections (CME). These are enormous emissions of coronal material and magnetic field that travel outward from the Sun at up to 3000 km/s, containing roughly 10 times the energy of the solar flare or prominence that accompanies them. Some larger CMEs can propel hundreds of millions of tons of material into interplanetary space at 600,000–2,000,000 miles per hour (970,000–3,220,000 km/h).

== Physics ==
=== Thermal conduction ===
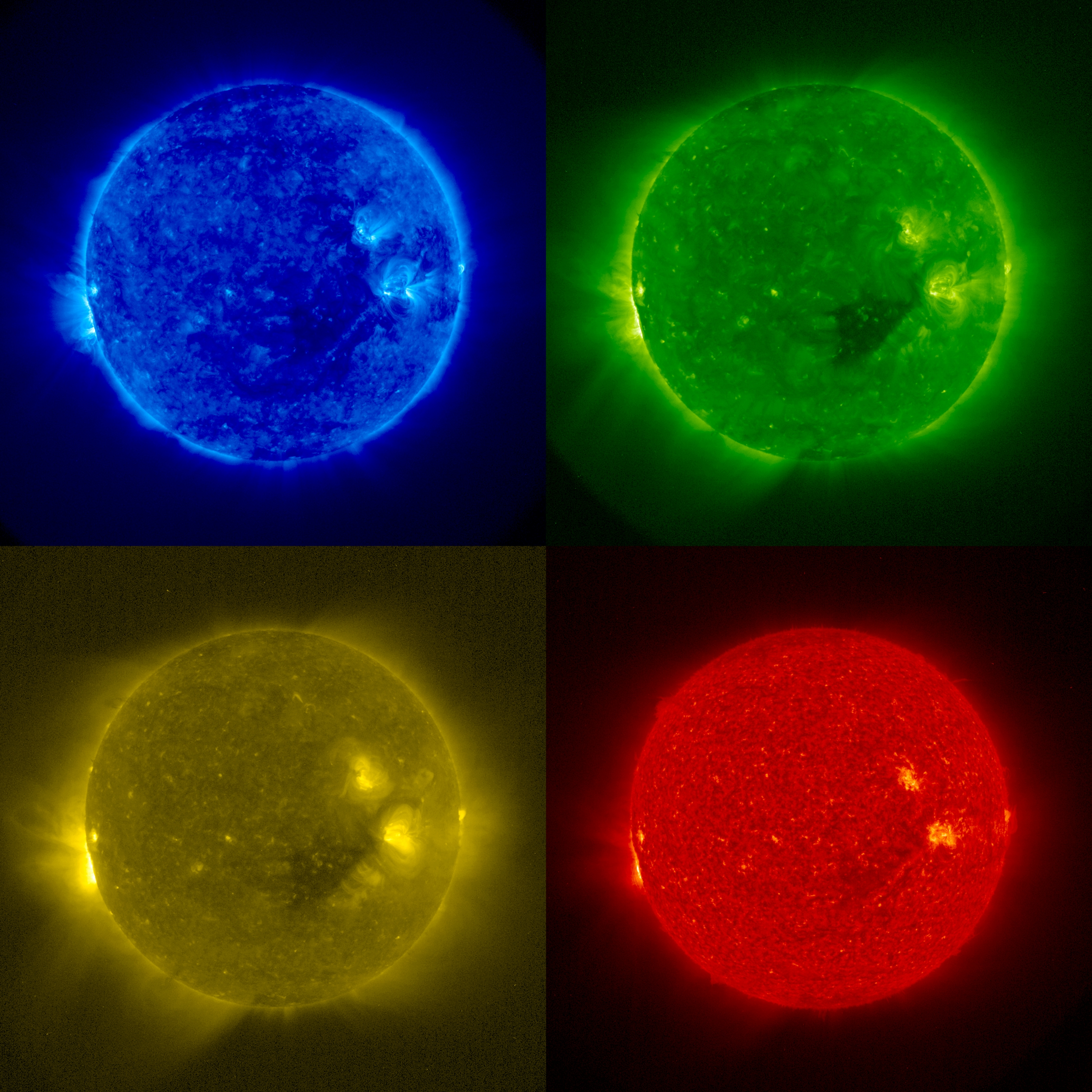
A mosaic of the extreme ultraviolet images taken from STEREO on December 4, 2006. These false color images show the Sun's atmospheres at a range of different temperatures. Clockwise from top left: 1 million degrees C (171 Å—blue), 1.5 million °C (195Å—green), 60000–80000°C (304 Å—red), and 2.5 million °C (286 Å—yellow).

In the corona thermal conduction occurs from the external hotter atmosphere towards the inner cooler layers. Responsible for the diffusion process of the heat are the electrons, which are much lighter than ions and move faster.

When there is a magnetic field the thermal conductivity of the plasma becomes higher in the direction which is parallel to the field lines rather than in the perpendicular direction. A charged particle moving in the direction perpendicular to the magnetic field line is subject to the Lorentz force which is normal to the plane individuated by the velocity and the magnetic field. This force bends the path of the particle. In general, since particles also have a velocity component along the magnetic field line, the Lorentz force constrains them to bend and move along spirals around the field lines at the cyclotron frequency.

If collisions between the particles are very frequent, they are scattered in every direction. This happens in the photosphere, where the plasma carries the magnetic field in its motion. In the corona, on the contrary, the mean free-path of the electrons is of the order of kilometres and even more, so each electron can do a helicoidal motion long before being scattered after a collision. Therefore, the heat transfer is enhanced along the magnetic field lines and inhibited in the perpendicular direction.

In the direction longitudinal to the magnetic field, the thermal conductivity of the corona is
$$k = 20 \left(\frac{2}{\pi}\right)^{3/2}\frac{\left(k_\text{B} T \right)^{5/2}k_\text{B}}{m_e^{1/2} e^4 \ln \Lambda} \approx \frac{T^{5/2}}{\ln \Lambda} \times 1.8 \times 10^{-10}~ \mathrm{W m^{-1}K^{-1}}$$
where $k_\text{B}$ is the Boltzmann constant, $T$ is the temperature in kelvin, $m_e$ is the electron mass, $e$ is the electric charge of the electron,
$$\ln \Lambda = \ln \left(12\pi n \lambda_D^3 \right)$$
is the Coulomb logarithm, and
$$\lambda_D = \sqrt{ \frac{k_\text{B} T }{4 \pi n e^2 }}$$
is the Debye length of the plasma with particle density $n$. The Coulomb logarithm $\ln \Lambda$ is roughly 20 in the corona, with a mean temperature of 1 MK and a density of 10^{15} particles/m^{3}, and about 10 in the chromosphere, where the temperature is approximately 10kK and the particle density is of the order of 10^{18} particles/m^{3}, and in practice it can be assumed constant.

Thence, if we indicate with $q$ the heat for a volume unit, expressed in J m^{−3}, the Fourier equation of heat transfer, to be computed only along the direction $x$ of the field line, becomes
$$\frac{\partial q}{\partial t} = 0.9 \times 10^{-11}~ \frac{\partial^2  T^{7/2}}{\partial x ^2 }.$$

Numerical calculations have shown that the thermal conductivity of the corona is comparable to that of copper.

=== Coronal seismology ===
Coronal seismology is a method of studying the plasma of the solar corona with the use of magnetohydrodynamic (MHD) waves. MHD studies the dynamics of electrically conducting fluids – in this case, the fluid is the coronal plasma. Philosophically, coronal seismology is similar to the Earth's seismology, the Sun's helioseismology, and MHD spectroscopy of laboratory plasma devices. In all these approaches, waves of various kinds are used to probe a medium. The potential of coronal seismology in the estimation of the coronal magnetic field, density scale height, fine structure and heating has been demonstrated by different research groups.

== Coronal heating problem ==
Unsolved problem in astronomy
Why is the Sun's corona so much hotter than the Sun's surface?
More unsolved problems in astronomy

A new visualisation technique can provide clues to the coronal heating problem.

The coronal heating problem in solar physics relates to the question of why the temperature of the Sun's corona is millions of kelvins greater than the thousands of kelvins of the surface. Several theories have been proposed to explain this phenomenon, but it is still challenging to determine which is correct. The problem first emerged after the identification of unknown spectral lines in the solar spectrum with highly ionized iron and calcium atoms. The comparison of the coronal and the photospheric temperatures of 6000K, leads to the question of how the 200-times-hotter coronal temperature can be maintained. The problem is primarily concerned with how the energy is transported up into the corona and then converted into heat within a few solar radii.

The high temperatures require energy to be carried from the solar interior to the corona by non-thermal processes, because the second law of thermodynamics prevents heat from flowing directly from the solar photosphere (surface), which is at about 5800K, to the much hotter corona at about 1 to 3 MK (parts of the corona can even reach 10MK).

Between the photosphere and the corona, the thin region through which the temperature increases is known as the transition region. It ranges from only tens to hundreds of kilometers thick. Energy cannot be transferred from the cooler photosphere to the corona by conventional heat transfer as this would violate the second law of thermodynamics. An analogy of this would be a light bulb raising the temperature of the air surrounding the bulb to a temperature greater than that of the bulb's glass surface. Hence, some other manner of energy transfer must be involved in the heating of the corona.

The amount of power required to heat the solar corona can easily be calculated as the difference between coronal radiative losses and heating by thermal conduction toward the chromosphere through the transition region. It is about 1 kilowatt for every square meter of surface area on the Sun's chromosphere, or 1/40000 of the amount of light energy that escapes the Sun.

Many coronal heating theories have been proposed, but two theories have remained as the most likely candidates: wave heating and magnetic reconnection (or nanoflares). Through most of the past 50 years, neither theory has been able to account for the extreme coronal temperatures.

In 2012, high resolution (<0.2″) soft X-ray imaging with the High Resolution Coronal Imager aboard a sounding rocket revealed tightly wound braids in the corona. It is hypothesized that the reconnection and unravelling of braids can act as primary sources of heating of the active solar corona to temperatures of up to 4 million kelvin. The main heat source in the quiescent corona (about 1.5 million kelvin) is assumed to originate from MHD waves.

NASA's Parker Solar Probe is intended to approach the Sun to a distance of approximately 9.5 solar radii to investigate coronal heating and the origin of the solar wind. It was successfully launched on August 12, 2018 and by late 2025 had completed the first 26 close approaches to the Sun.

Competing theories of heating mechanisms
Heating models
Hydrodynamic	Magnetic	
No magnetic field; Slow rotating stars	DC (reconnection)	AC (waves)
No magnetic field; Slow rotating stars	B-field stresses; Reconnection events; Flares-nanoflares; Uniform heating rates	Photospheric foot point shuffling; MHD wave propagation; High Alfvén wave flux; Non-uniform heating rates

=== Wave heating theory ===
The wave heating theory, proposed in 1949 by Evry Schatzman, proposes that waves carry energy from the solar interior to the solar chromosphere and corona. The Sun is made of plasma rather than ordinary gas, so it supports several types of waves analogous to sound waves in air. The most important types of wave are magneto-acoustic waves and Alfvén waves. Magneto-acoustic waves are sound waves that have been modified by the presence of a magnetic field, and Alfvén waves are similar to ultra low frequency radio waves that have been modified by interaction with matter in the plasma. Both types of waves can be launched by the turbulence of granulation and super granulation at the solar photosphere, and both types of waves can carry energy for some distance through the solar atmosphere before turning into shock waves that dissipate their energy as heat.

One problem with wave heating is delivery of the heat to the appropriate place. Magneto-acoustic waves cannot carry sufficient energy upward through the chromosphere to the corona, both because of the low pressure present in the chromosphere and because they tend to be reflected back to the photosphere. Alfvén waves can carry enough energy, but do not dissipate that energy rapidly enough once they enter the corona. Waves in plasmas are notoriously difficult to understand and describe analytically, but computer simulations, carried out by Thomas Bogdan and colleagues in 2003, seem to show that Alfvén waves can transmute into other wave modes at the base of the corona, providing a pathway that can carry large amounts of energy from the photosphere through the chromosphere and transition region and finally into the corona where it dissipates it as heat.

Another problem with wave heating has been the complete absence, until the late 1990s, of any direct evidence of waves propagating through the solar corona. The first direct observation of waves propagating into and through the solar corona was made in 1997 with the Solar and Heliospheric Observatory space-borne solar observatory, the first platform capable of observing the Sun in the extreme ultraviolet (EUV) for long periods of time with stable photometry. Those were magneto-acoustic waves with a frequency of about 1 millihertz (mHz, corresponding to a 1000second wave period), that carry only about 10% of the energy required to heat the corona. Many observations exist of localized wave phenomena, such as Alfvén waves launched by solar flares, but those events are transient and cannot explain the uniform coronal heat.

It is not yet known exactly how much wave energy is available to heat the corona. Results published in 2004 using data from the TRACE spacecraft seem to indicate that there are waves in the solar atmosphere at frequencies as high as 100mHz (10 second period). Measurements of the temperature of different ions in the solar wind with the UVCS instrument aboard SOHO give strong indirect evidence that there are waves at frequencies as high as 200Hz, well into the range of human hearing. These waves are very difficult to detect under normal circumstances, but evidence collected during solar eclipses by teams from Williams College suggest the presences of such waves in the 1–10Hz range.

Recently, Alfvénic motions have been found in the lower solar atmosphere and also in the quiet Sun, in coronal holes and in active regions using observations with AIA on board the Solar Dynamics Observatory. These Alfvénic oscillations have significant power, and seem to be connected to the chromospheric Alfvénic oscillations previously reported with the Hinode spacecraft.

Solar wind observations with the Wind spacecraft have recently shown evidence to support theories of Alfvén-cyclotron dissipation, leading to local ion heating.

=== Magnetic reconnection theory ===
The magnetic reconnection theory relies on the solar magnetic field to induce electric currents in the solar corona. The currents then collapse suddenly, releasing energy as heat and wave energy in the corona. This process is called "reconnection" because of the peculiar way that magnetic fields behave in plasma (or any electrically conductive fluid such as mercury or seawater). In a plasma, magnetic field lines are normally tied to individual pieces of matter, so that the topology of the magnetic field remains the same: if a particular north and south magnetic pole are connected by a single field line, then even if the plasma is stirred or if the magnets are moved around, that field line will continue to connect those particular poles. The connection is maintained by electric currents that are induced in the plasma. Under certain conditions, the electric currents can collapse, allowing the magnetic field to "reconnect" to other magnetic poles and release heat and wave energy in the process.

Magnetic reconnection is hypothesized to be the mechanism behind solar flares, the largest explosions in the Solar System. Furthermore, the surface of the Sun is covered with millions of small magnetized regions 50–1000km across. These small magnetic poles are buffeted and churned by the constant granulation. The magnetic field in the solar corona must undergo nearly constant reconnection to match the motion of this "magnetic carpet", so the energy released by the reconnection is a natural candidate for the coronal heat, perhaps as a series of "microflares" that individually provide very little energy but together account for the required energy.

The idea that nanoflares might heat the corona was proposed by Eugene Parker in the 1980s but is still controversial. In particular, ultraviolet telescopes such as TRACE and SOHO/EIT can observe individual micro-flares as small brightenings in extreme ultraviolet light, but there seem to be too few of these small events to account for the energy released into the corona. The additional energy not accounted for could be made up by wave energy, or by gradual magnetic reconnection that releases energy more smoothly than micro-flares and therefore does not appear well in the TRACE data. Variations on the micro-flare hypothesis use other mechanisms to stress the magnetic field or to release the energy, and are a subject of active research in 2005.

=== Spicules (type II) ===
For decades, researchers believed spicules could send heat into the corona. However, following observational research in the 1980s, it was found that spicule plasma did not reach coronal temperatures, and so the theory was discounted.

As per studies performed in 2010 at the National Center for Atmospheric Research in Colorado, in collaboration with the Lockheed Martin's Solar and Astrophysics Laboratory (LMSAL) and the Institute of Theoretical Astrophysics of the University of Oslo, a new class of spicules (TYPE II) discovered in 2007, which travel faster (up to 100 km/s) and have shorter lifespans, can account for the problem. These jets insert heated plasma into the Sun's outer atmosphere.

The Atmospheric Imaging Assembly on NASA's Solar Dynamics Observatory and NASA's Focal Plane Package for the Solar Optical Telescope on the Japanese Hinode satellite were used to test this hypothesis. The high spatial and temporal resolutions of the newer instruments reveal this coronal mass supply.

According to analysis in 2011 by de Pontieu and colleagues, these observations reveal a one-to-one connection between plasma that is heated to millions of degrees and the spicules that insert this plasma into the corona.

== See also ==
- Advanced Composition Explorer
- Geocorona
- Solar eclipses in visual art
- Supernova
- Supra-arcade downflows
- X-ray astronomy
