= Corotating interaction region =

Solar wind structure

A corotating interaction region (CIR) is a recurring plasma structure in the heliosphere formed when fast solar wind streams interact with slower solar wind ahead of them. This interaction creates a compressed region that appears to rotate with the Sun's rotation; accordingly it is named "corotating".

CIRs develop when high-speed solar wind, typically originating from coronal holes, catches up to slower wind streams. The resulting compression creates distinct boundaries: a forward pressure wave at the leading edge and a reverse pressure wave at the trailing edge. At greater distances from the Sun, these pressure waves can develop into shock waves.

The three-dimensional structure of CIRs is influenced by the Sun's magnetic field configuration. Because the Sun's magnetic equator is often tilted and warped relative to its rotational equator, CIRs typically show significant north–south tilts that differ between hemispheres. The forward waves tend to move toward the solar equatorial plane as distance increases, while reverse waves propagate toward higher latitudes.

CIRs play several important roles in space weather and heliophysics: they can trigger geomagnetic storms when they reach Earth, influence the distribution of energetic particles in the heliosphere, contribute to the modulation of cosmic rays, particularly during periods of low solar activity, and cause compression of the interplanetary magnetic field.
