= High Resolution Coronal Imager =

Suborbital solar telescope

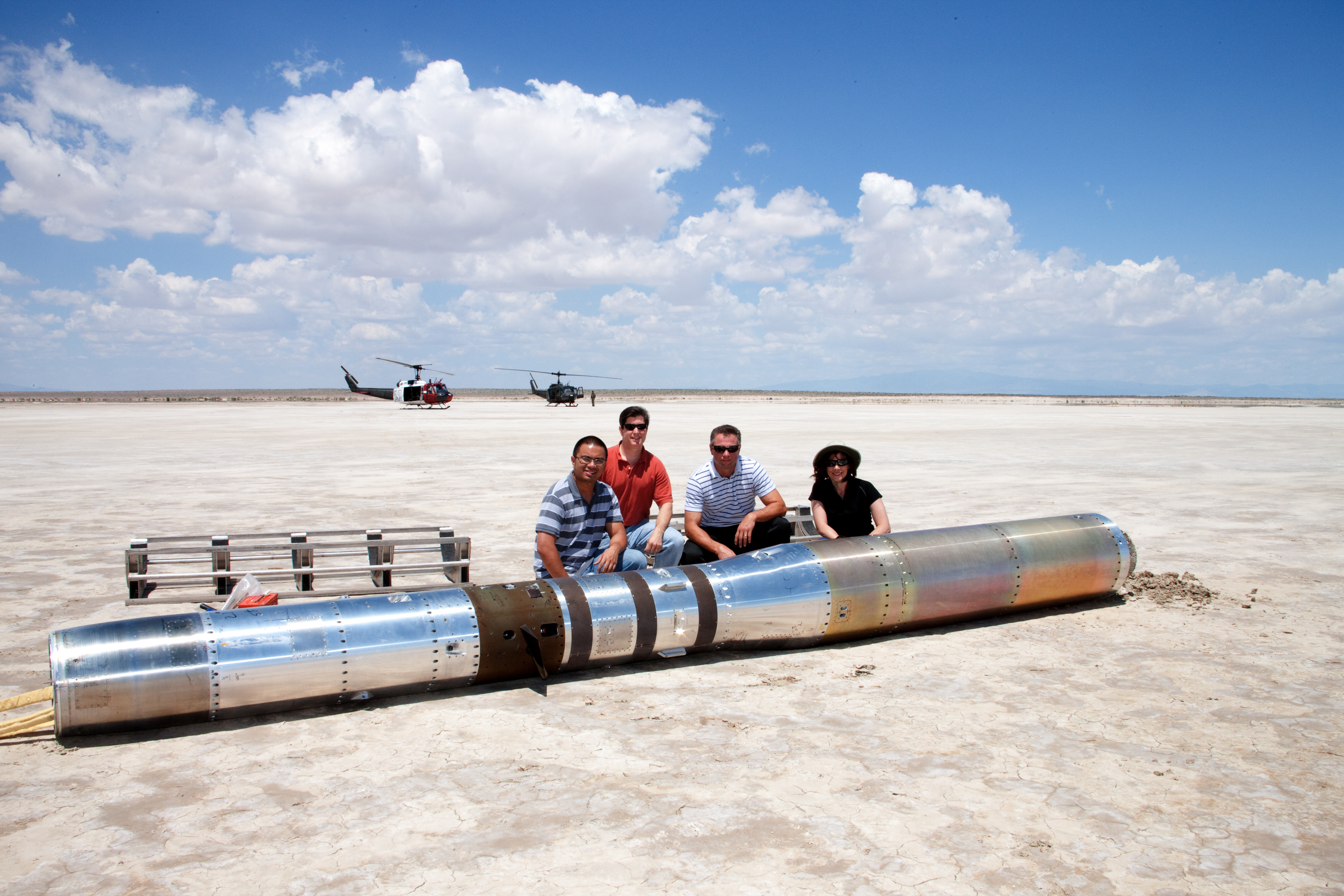
The recovering team poses for a photo with the payload before loading the instrument into a pair of U.S. Army helicopters and returning to base.

The High Resolution Coronal Imager (Hi-C) is a sub-orbital telescope designed to take high-resolution images of the Sun's corona. As of 2020 it has been launched three times, but only the first and the third launches, on July 11, 2012, and May 29, 2018, resulted in a successful mission. It was launched aboard a Black Brant IX sounding rocket from White Sands Missile Range, New Mexico. The images taken were the highest resolution photos ever of the Sun's corona.

== Telescope description ==
The telescope weighs 464 pounds (210 kg), and is 10 feet (3.0 m) long. The mirrors are approximately 9.5 inches (24 cm) across. Its optics were designed at the Marshall Space Flight Center in Huntsville, Alabama with assistance from the Smithsonian Astrophysical Observatory and L-3Com/Tinsley Laboratories of Richmond, California. Dr. Jonathan Cirtain, from MSFC said: "These mirrors were to be the finest pieces of glass ever fabricated for solar astrophysics."

=== Imaging system ===
The imaging system was designed by Apogee Imaging Systems with a resolution of 0.1 arcsec/pixel (14 times higher resolution than the Solar Dynamics Observatory). It was based on a customized version of the E2V CCD203 from Lockheed Martin, which is a very large 4 channel back illuminated 4,000 × 4,000 pixel charge-coupled device (CCD).

== Missions ==
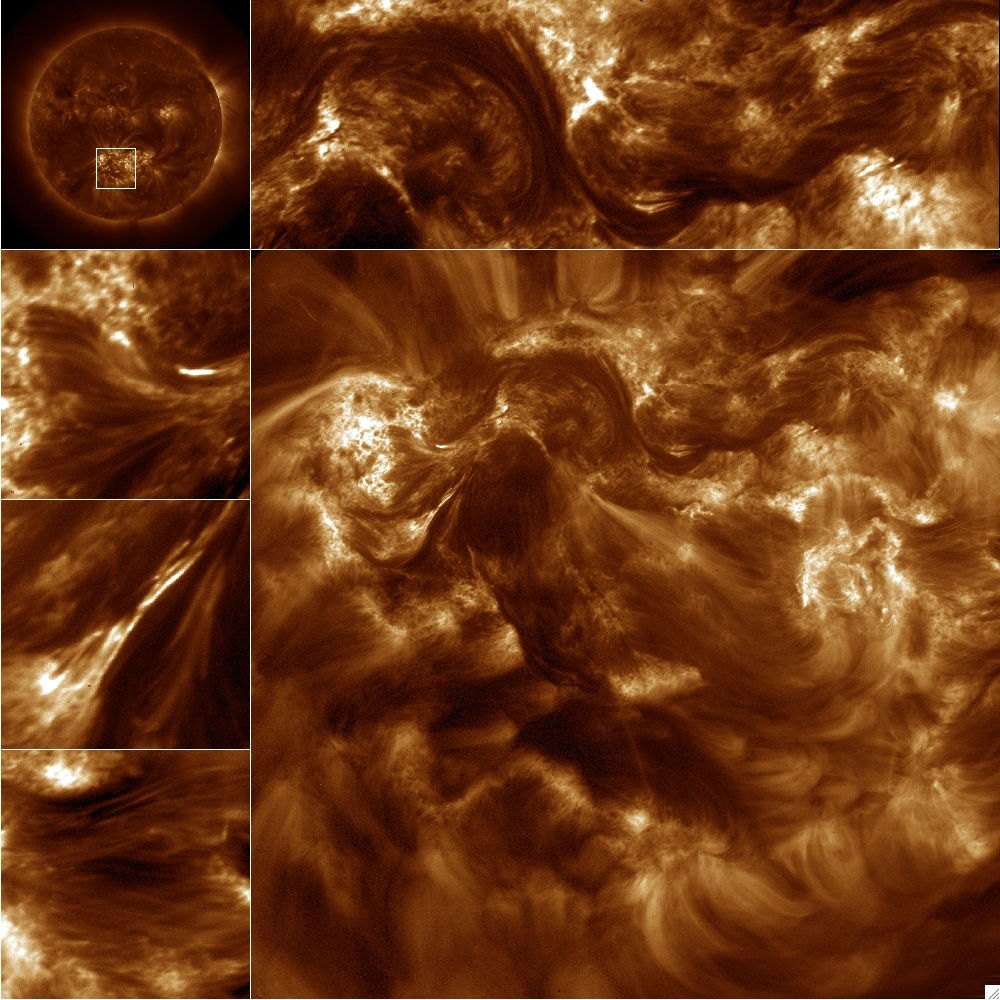
Images of the Sun's million degree corona, including images of the magnetic braids (left hand side).

The first flight lasted for 10 minutes, reached an altitude of 283 kilometres (176 mi) and the telescope captured 165 images of a large active region. It imaged the Sun in ultraviolet light at 19.3 nm wavelength. The total cost of the mission was $5 million.

On the second flight, in 2018, five and a half minutes (329 seconds) of pictures were taken of an area on the sun 4.4 arcminutes square (the sun's disk being about 30 arcminutes in diameter). Seventy eight images were taken at intervals of 4.4 seconds, with a two-second exposure time, at the extreme ultraviolet wavelength of 17.2 nanometres which is dominated by Fe IX emission (emission from iron in the +8 ionization state) indicating temperatures around 800 000 Kelvin. The instrument was able to resolve strands of plasma as narrow as about 200 kilometres wide.

== Findings ==
The first mission revealed never-before-seen "magnetic braids" of plasma roiling in the Sun's outer layers. It was the first time scientists were able to directly observe magnetic reconnection in braids, which may be the primary sources of heating in the active solar corona.
