= Coronal hole =

Cool, tenuous region of the Sun's corona

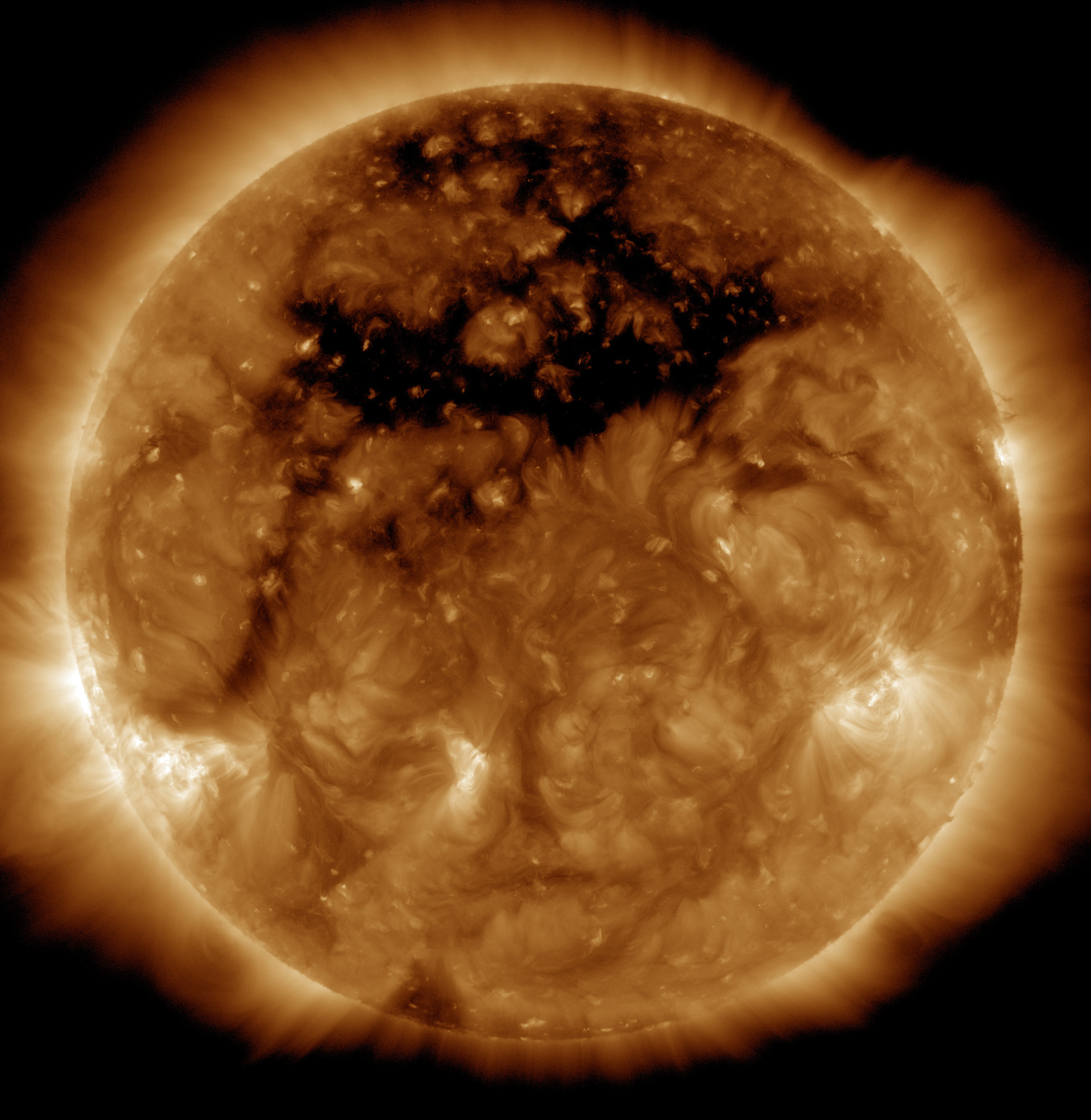
When observed in extreme ultraviolet, coronal holes appear as relatively dark patches in the Sun's corona. Here, there is a big coronal hole in the northern hemisphere.

Coronal holes are regions of the Sun's corona that emit low levels of ultraviolet and X-ray radiation compared to their surroundings. They are composed of relatively cool and tenuous plasma permeated by magnetic fields that are open to interplanetary space. Compared to the corona's usual closed magnetic field that arches between regions of opposite magnetic polarity, the open magnetic field of a coronal hole allows solar wind to escape into space at a much quicker rate. This results in decreased temperature and density of the plasma at the site of a coronal hole, as well as an increased speed in the average solar wind measured in interplanetary space.

Streams of fast solar wind originating from coronal holes can interact with slow solar wind streams to produce corotating interaction regions. These regions can interact with Earth's magnetosphere to produce geomagnetic storms of minor to moderate intensity. During solar minima, CIRs are the main cause of geomagnetic storms.

== History ==
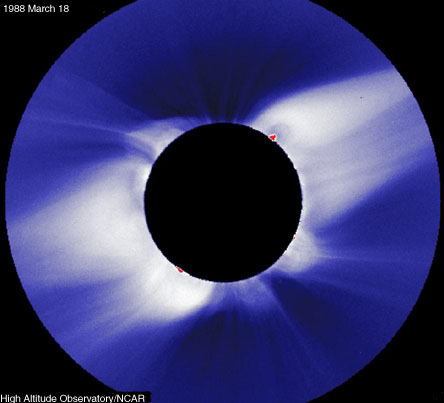
When the Sun's disk is obscured during a total solar eclipse or by a coronagraph (pictured), coronal structures not otherwise visible can be observed above the limb.

Coronal holes were first observed during total solar eclipses. They appeared as dark regions surrounded by much brighter helmet streamers above the Sun's limb.

In the 1960s, coronal holes appeared in X-ray images taken by sounding rockets and in observations at radio wavelengths by the Sydney Chris Cross radio telescope. At the time, what they were was unclear. Their true nature was recognized in the 1970s, when X-ray telescopes in the Skylab mission were flown above the Earth's atmosphere to reveal the structure of the corona.

== Solar cycle ==
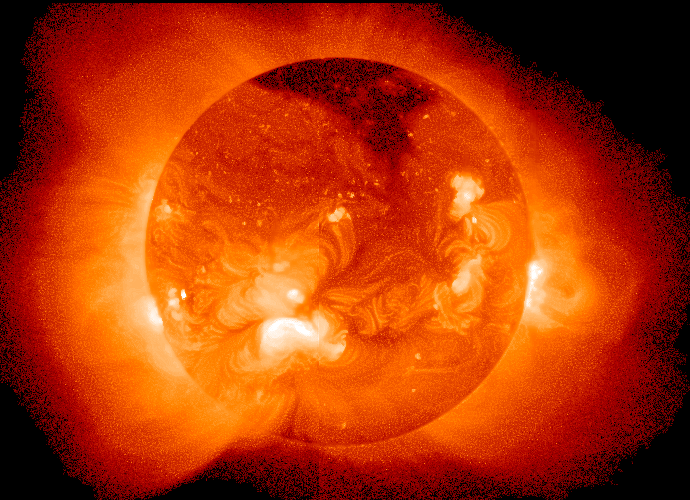
A coronal hole at the Sun's north pole observed in soft X-ray

Coronal hole size and population correspond with the solar cycle. As the Sun heads toward solar maximum, the coronal holes move closer and closer to the Sun's poles. During solar maxima, the number of coronal holes decreases until the magnetic fields on the Sun reverse. Afterwards, fresh coronal holes appear near the new poles. The coronal holes then increase in size and number, extending further from the poles as the Sun moves toward a solar minimum again.

== Solar wind ==
The solar wind exists primarily in two alternating states referred to as the slow solar wind and the fast solar wind. The latter originates in coronal holes and has radial flow speeds of 450–800 km/s compared to speeds of 250–450 km/s for the slow solar wind. Interactions between fast and slow solar wind streams produce stream interaction regions which, if present after a solar rotation, are referred to as co-rotating interaction regions (CIRs).

CIRs can interact with Earth's magnetosphere, creating minor- to moderate-intensity geomagnetic storms. The majority of moderate-intensity geomagnetic storms originate from CIRs. Geomagnetic storms originating from CIRs typically have a gradual commencement (over hours) and are not as severe as storms caused by coronal mass ejections (CMEs), which usually have a sudden onset. Since coronal holes and associated CIRs can last for several solar rotations (i.e., several months), predicting the recurrence of this type of disturbance is often possible significantly further in advance than for CME-related disturbances.

== See also ==
- Coronal mass ejection § Coronal signatures – includes coronal dimmings, sometimes referred to as transient coronal holes
- Sunspot – dark spots on the Sun's photosphere
- List of solar storms
