= Yohkoh =

Japanese spacecraft

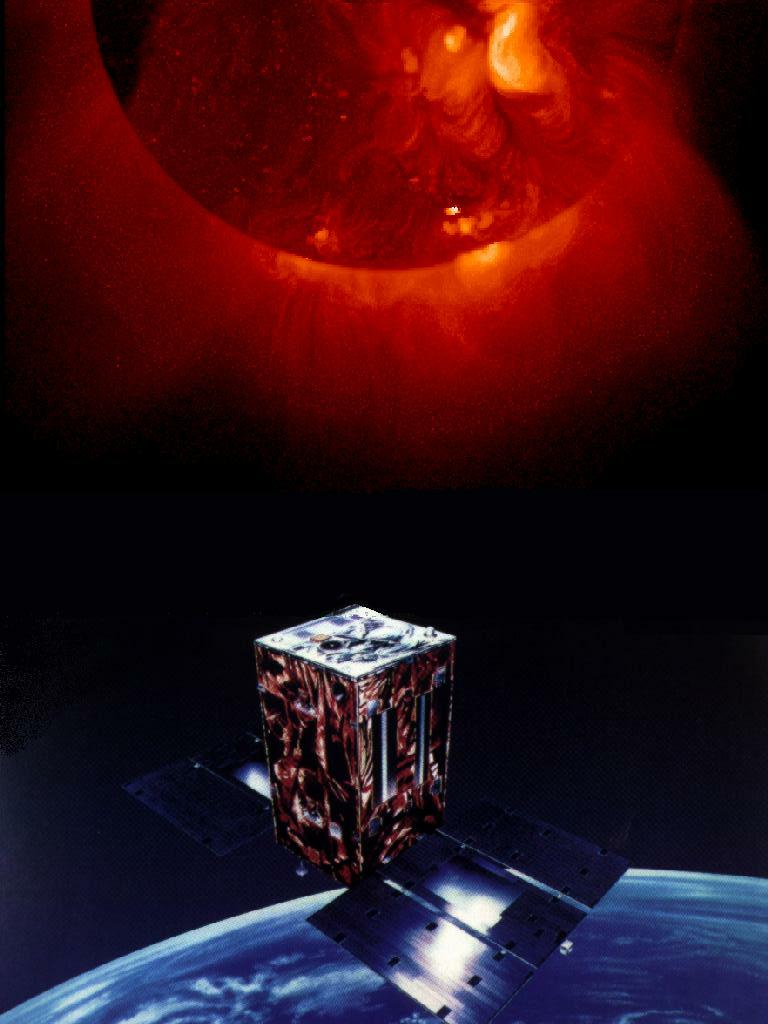
- Artist concept of the Japanese Yohkoh spacecraft
- Names: Solar-A (before launch
- Mission type: Heliophysics
- Operator: ISAS / NASA / PPARC
- COSPAR ID: 1991-062A
- SATCAT no.: 21694
- Website: Yohkoh home page
- Mission duration: 10 years, 3 months and 14 days (achieved)

Spacecraft properties
- Launch mass: 390 kilograms (860 lb)
- Dimensions: 2 m (6 ft 7 in) x 2 m (6 ft 7 in) x 4 m (13 ft)

Start of mission
- Launch date: 02:30, 30 August 1991 (UTC)
- Rocket: Mu-3S-II
- Launch site: Kagoshima M1

End of mission
- Disposal: Spacecraft lost accidentally
- Last contact: 14 December 2001
- Decay date: 12 September 2005

Orbital parameters
- Reference system: Geocentric
- Perigee altitude: 516 kilometres (321 mi)
- Apogee altitude: 754 kilometres (469 mi)
- Inclination: 31.3°
- Period: 97.4 min

Yohkoh (Japanese: ようこう, 'Sunbeam'), known before launch as Solar-A, was a Solar observatory spacecraft of the Institute of Space and Astronautical Science (Japan), in collaboration with space agencies in the United States and the United Kingdom. It was launched into Earth orbit on August 30, 1991 by the M-3SII rocket from Kagoshima Space Center. It took its first soft X-ray image on 13 September 1991, 21:53:40, and movie representations of the X-ray corona over 1991-2001 are available at the Yohkoh Legacy site.

== Description ==
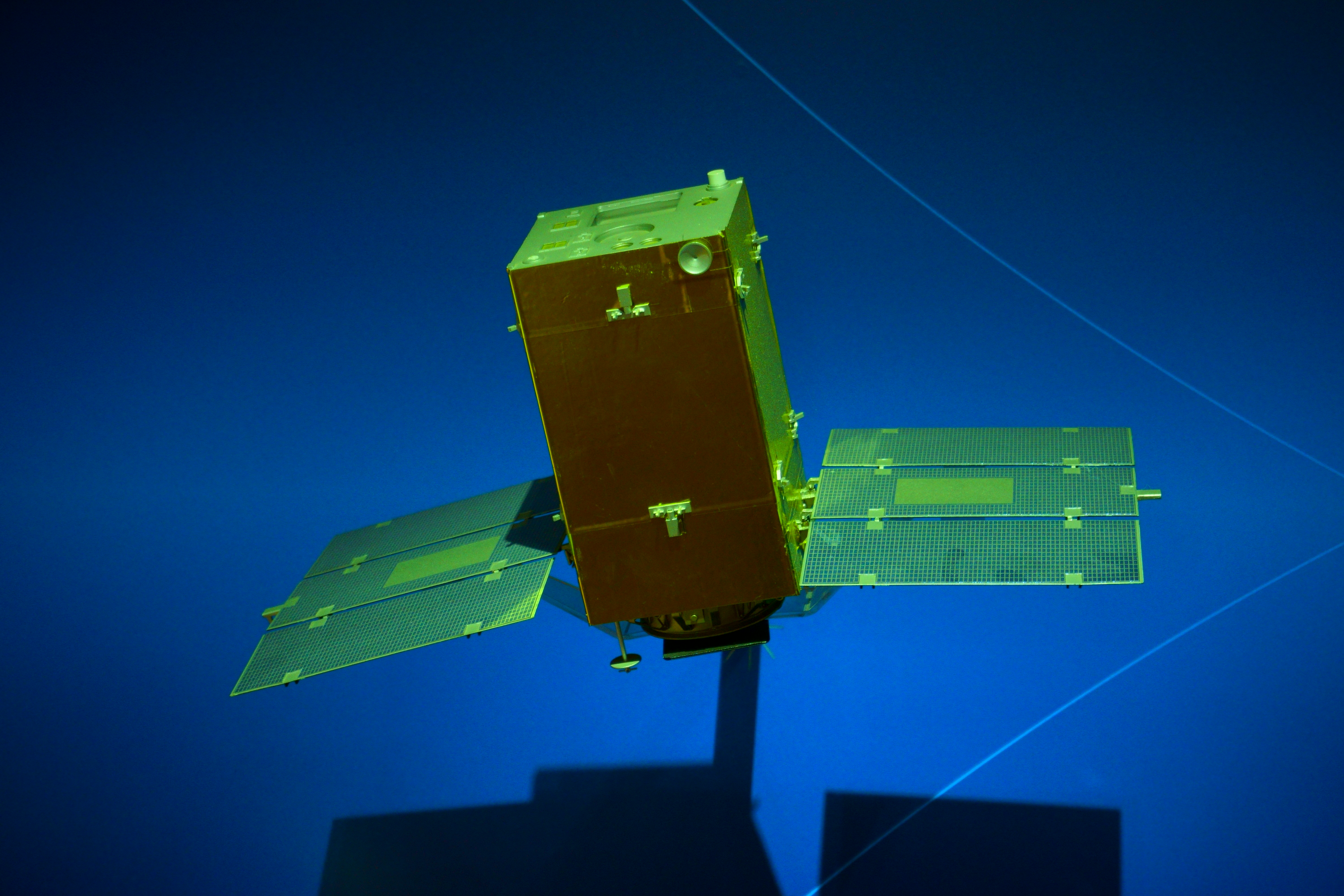
Scale model of the Yohkoh at Noshiro City Children's Center

The satellite was three-axis stabilized and in a near-circular orbit. It carried four instruments: a Soft X-ray Telescope (SXT), a Hard X-ray Telescope (HXT), a Bragg Crystal Spectrometer (BCS), and a Wide Band Spectrometer (WBS). About 50 MB were generated each day and stored on board by a 10.5 MB bubble memory recorder.

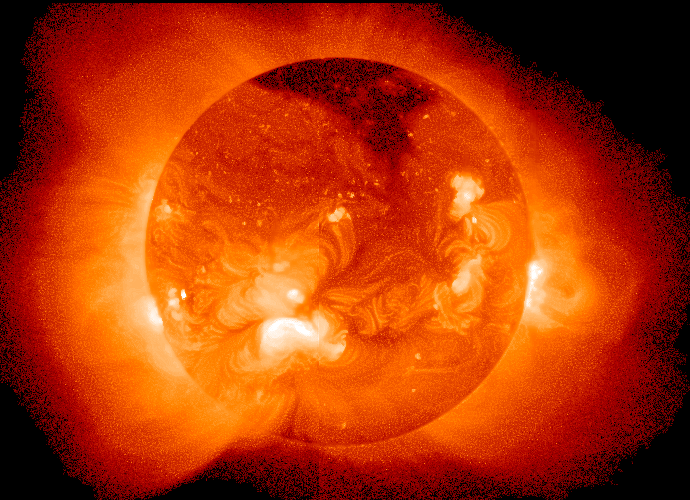
Sun as viewed by the Soft X-Ray Telescope (SXT) onboard the orbiting Yohkoh satellite (8 May 1992).

Because SXT utilized a charge-coupled device (CCD) as its readout device, perhaps being the first X-ray astronomical telescope to do so, its "data cube" of images was both extensive and convenient, and it revealed much interesting detail about the behavior of the solar corona. Previous solar soft X-ray observations, such as those of Skylab, had been restricted to film as a readout device. Yohkoh therefore returned many novel scientific results, especially regarding solar flares and other forms of magnetic activity.

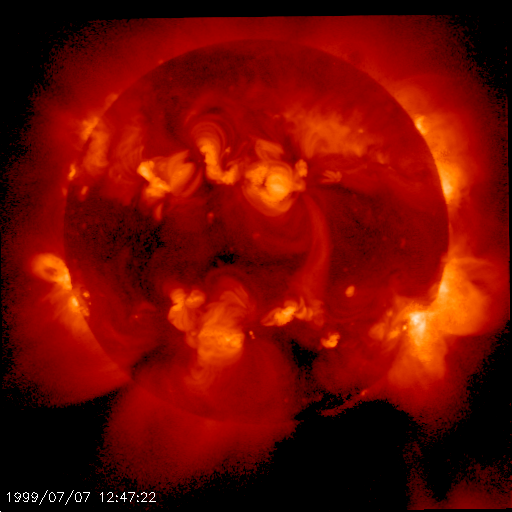
Sun as viewed by the Soft X-Ray Telescope (SXT) with the thin Al filter onboard the Yohkoh spacecraft (7 July 1999).

The mission ended after more than ten years of successful observation when it went into its "safehold" mode during an annular eclipse on 14 December 2001, 20:58:33 and the spacecraft lost lock on the Sun. Operational mistakes and other flaws combined in such a way that its solar panels could no longer charge the batteries, which drained irreversibly; several other solar eclipses had successfully been observed.

On 12 September 2005, the spacecraft burned up during reentry over South Asia. The time of reentry, as provided by the U.S. Space Surveillance Network, was 6:16 pm Japan Standard Time (JST).

== Instruments ==
Yohkoh carried four instruments :

- The Soft X-ray Telescope (SXT) was an X-ray telescope with glancing incidence X-ray mirror and a CCD sensor. There was also a co-aligned optical telescope using the same CCD, but after the failure of the entrance filter in November 1992 it became unusable.

The CCD was 1024×1024 pixels with pixel angular size of 2.45″×2.45″, a point-spread function (core width FWHM) of about 1.5 pixels (i.e. 3.7″), a field of view of 42′×42′, which was a little larger than the whole solar disk. Typical time resolution was 2 s in flare mode and 8 s in quiet (no flare) mode, the maximum time resolution in 0.5 s.

For spectral discrimination, SXT employed wide-band filters installed on a filter wheel. There were five usable filter positions: 1265 Å-thick Al filter (2.5 Å–36 Å pass band), Al/Mg/Mn filter (2.4 Å–32 Å), 2.52 μm Mg filter (2.4 Å–23 Å), 11.6 μm Al filter (2.4 Å–13 Å), 119 μm Be filter (2.3 Å–10 Å). Before the entrance filter failure in November 1992 three more filter positions were available: no analysis filter (2.5 Å–46 Å), Wide band optical filter (4600 Å–4800 Å), Narrow band optical filter (4290 Å–4320 Å).

- The Hard X-ray Telescope (HXT) was a Fourier-synthesis X-ray imager with 64 bigrid collimators sparsely sampling the (u,v) plane and feeding individual scintillation-counter detectors. HXT was sensitive to photons with energies from 14 keV to 93 keV, this range was divided into four energy bands (called L, M1, M2, H). The angular resolution was about 5″, image synthesis field of view is 2′×2′, maximum time resolution was 0.5 s.
- Bragg Crystal Spectrometer (BCS) was two bent crystal spectrometers sensitive in four spectral lines: the line of ion Fe XXVI (1.76 Å–1.81 Å), ion Fe XXV (1.83 Å–1.90 Å), ion Ca XIX (3.16 Å–3.19 Å), and ion S XV (5.02 Å–5.11 Å). Spectral resolution varied in the range of λ/Δλ=3000–8000, typical time resolution in flare mode was 8 s, maximum is 0.125 s. BCS integrates radiation over the whole solar disc.
- Wide Band Spectrometer (WBS) had spectroscopic capabilities in a wide energy band from 3 keV to 100 MeV. WBS was a set of four subinstruments, eаch of them outputs Pulse Count (PC) corresponding to intensity integrated over a band, and Pulse Height (PH) profile which corresponded to spectrum. Time resolution for PC (0.125 s–4 s for different subinstruments and modes) was 8–16 times better than for PH (1 s–32 s). WBS integrated radiation over the whole Sun and did not resolve source position.
  - Soft X-ray Spectrometer (SXS) consisted of two proportional gas counters with nominal energy band 5 keV–40 keV, which was divided into two PC channels and 128 PH channels. It was found after the launch that PH to energy relationship was distorted. No energy calibration for WBS PH data was available in 1999.
  - Hard X-ray Spectrometer (HXS) was a NaI(Tl) scintillator. The energy band after June 1992 was 24 keV–830 keV. It was divided into 2 PC channels and 32 PH channels.
  - Gamma-ray Spectrometer (GRS) consisted of two identical bismuth germanate oxide scintillators. It covered energy range 0.3 MeV–100 MeV, which was divided into 6 PC channels and 128+16 PH channels.
  - Radiation Belt Monitor (RBM) unlike the other three was not aimed at solar flare observations and served to sound the alarm for radiation belt passage.
