= MSSTA =

Sounding rocket payload

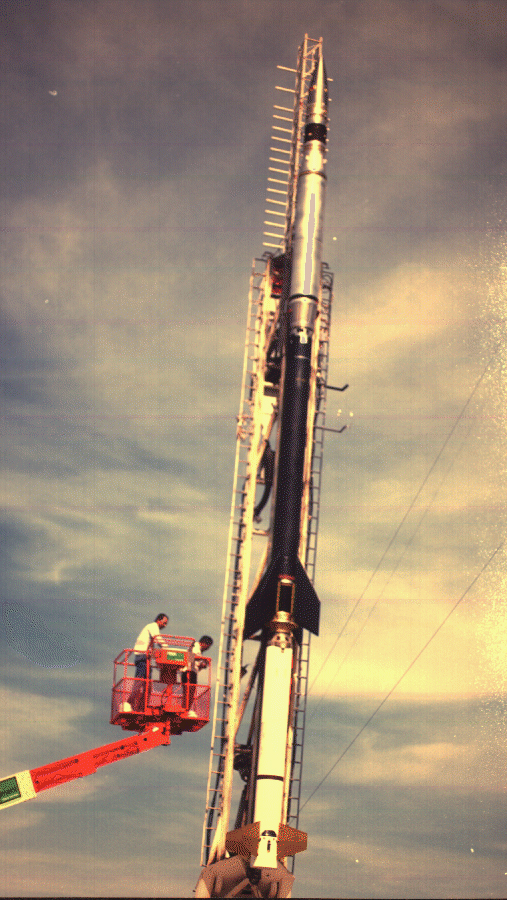
Sounding rocket 36.049, carrying the MSSTA (silvery section at top), on the launch rail at White Sands Missile Range, May 1991. The personnel aboard the crane have just installed an arming plug into the payload to prepare it for launch.

The Multi-Spectral Solar Telescope Array (MSSTA) was a sounding rocket payload built by Arthur B. C. Walker Jr. at Stanford University in the 1990s to test EUV/XUV imaging of the Sun using normal incidence EUV-reflective multilayer optics.

== History ==
MSSTA contained a large number of individual telescopes (> 10), all trained on the Sun and all sensitive to slightly different wavelengths of ultraviolet light. Like all sounding rockets, MSSTA flew for approximately 14 minutes per mission, about 5 minutes of which were in space—just enough time to test a new technology or yield "first results" science. MSSTA is one of the last solar observing instruments to use photographic film rather than a digital camera system such as a CCD. MSSTA used film instead of a CCD in order to achieve the highest possible spatial resolution and to avoid the electronics difficulty presented by the large number of detectors that would have been required for its many telescopes.

MSSTA and its sister rocket, NIXT, were prototypes for normal incidence extreme ultraviolet imaging telescopes that are in use today, as well as the historic EIT instrument aboard the SOHO spacecraft, and the TRACE spacecraft. MSSTA flew three times: once in 1991 (NASA Sounding Rocket flight 36.049), once in 1994 (flight 36.091), and once in 2002 (flight 36.194). While Walker's 1991 telescope was the first in the series to carry the MSSTA moniker, the precursor to the MSSTA, the Stanford/MSFC Rocket Spectroheliograph (NASA Sounding Rocket flight 27.092), which carried two EUV telescopes in 1987, was the first mission to successfully obtain high-resolution, full-disk solar images utilizing normal incidence EUV optics. The MSSTA I flown in 1991 carried 14 telescopes; the MSSTA II flown in 1994 carried 19 telescopes; and the MSSTA III flown in 2002 carried 11 telescopes.

Several Stanford Ph.D. degrees in Physics resulted from the MSSTA program. These include those earned by Joakim Lindblom, Maxwell J. Allen, Ray H. O'Neal, Craig Edward DeForest, Charles C. Kankelborg, Hakeem Oluseyi, Dennis S. Martinez-Galarce, and Paul F.X. Boerner.

== See also ==
- Rapid Acquisition Imaging Spectrograph Experiment
- NIXT
