= Rapid Acquisition Imaging Spectrograph Experiment =

Rapid Acquisition Imaging Spectrograph Experiment or RAISE is a NASA funded series of sounding rocket missions to study the Sun in extreme ultraviolet. RAISE is supported by NASA's Sounding Rocket Program at NASA's Wallops Flight Facility in Virginia. NASA's Heliophysics Division manages the Sounding Rocket Program.

Several missions continuously study the Sun – such as NASA's Solar Dynamics Observatory (SDO), and the Solar Terrestrial Relations Observatory (STEREO) – but certain areas of the Sun demand especially high-cadence observations in order to understand the rapid changes occurring there. This is the purpose of RAISE.

The third flight in the series was launched as RAISE at 14:24:58 EDT, on 5 May 2017. The payload was launched on a NASA Black Brant IX sounding rocket at the White Sands Missile Range in New Mexico and flew to an altitude of 296 km (184 mi). The experimenter, Don Hassler with the Southwest Research Institute, reported that good data from the instruments observing the Sun was received during the flight. The payload was recovered.

== See also ==
- NIXT (Sounding rocket program)
- MSSTA
