= Arthur B. C. Walker Jr. =

American physicist and EUV/XUV optics pioneer (1936–2001)

Arthur B.C. Walker Jr.
- Born: August 24, 1936; Cleveland, Ohio
- Died: April 29, 2001 (aged 64)
- Education: University of Illinois, Case Institute of Technology, Bronx High School of Science
- Known for: Pioneering EUV/XUV optics, developing normal incidence multilayer XUV telescopes to photograph the solar corona, and mentoring students from underrepresented groups
- Scientific career
- Fields: Solar physics, astrophysics, astronomy
- Workplaces: Stanford University, Aerospace Corporation, U.S. Air Force
- Thesis: Photo meson Production from Neutrons Bound in Helium and Deuterium
- Notable students: Sally Ride, Hakeem Oluseyi

Arthur Bertram Cuthbert Walker Jr. (August 24, 1936 – April 29, 2001) was an American solar physicist and a pioneer of EUV/XUV optics. He developed normal incidence multilayer XUV telescopes to photograph the solar corona. Two of his sounding rocket payloads, the Stanford/MSFC Rocket Spectroheliograph Experiment and the Multi-Spectral Solar Telescope Array, recorded the first full-disk, high-resolution images of the Sun in XUV with conventional geometries of normal incidence optics. This technology is used in solar telescopes such as SOHO/EIT and TRACE, and in the fabrication of microchips via ultraviolet photolithography.

== Early life and education ==
Walker was born in Cleveland, Ohio on August 24, 1936, to Arthur and Hilda Walker. He was an only child. Arthur moved to New York City at the age of five. Arthur attended Bronx High School of Science. In 1957 he completed his undergraduate studies at Case Institute of Technology in Cleveland. Here, he earned his bachelor's degree in physics.

Both his master's degree and doctorate in astrophysics came from the University of Illinois, in 1958 and 1962 respectively. His dissertation for his doctorate titled, “Photo meson Production from Neutrons Bound in Helium and Deuterium,” focused on the atomic binding of protons and neutrons, as well as the radiation and force carriers involved in this process.

== Career ==
In 1962, Walker began his scientific career in the U.S. Air Force. He held the rank of first lieutenant, and worked in the Weapons Laboratory. Walker helped to create a satellite to study Van Allen belt radiation.

He also worked at the Space Physics Laboratory of the Aerospace Corporation, when his military stint ended in 1965. Here, Walker directed the Space Astronomy Program from 1971 to 1973. Much of his career involved using rocket technology and satellites to study the Sun's atmosphere at the ultraviolet and X-ray levels.

He was a professor at Stanford University from 1974 until his death on April 29, 2001. Walker started as the associate professor of applied physics in January 1974 and became a full professor in 1982. By 1991 he became a joint professor in applied physics and physics. Walker was a member of the Stanford's Center for Space and Astrophysics, as well as the Astronomy Program, for all his time at the school. He also chaired the Astronomy Program from 1977 to 1980.

Walker mentored thirteen graduate students over his career at Stanford, and a majority of these students came from underrepresented groups in science. His first graduate student, Sally Ride, went on to become the first American woman in space. Walker also set up an informal advocacy association with other black faculty members called the "Banneker Group".

He was instrumental in building Congressional approval for the National Solar Observatory, and served on the Rogers Commission which investigated the explosion of the Space Shuttle Challenger in 1986.

== Research ==
Walker, alongside H.R. Rugge, completed early studies, from 1965 to 1975, to view the Sun's atmosphere with X-ray imaging. After coming to Stanford, Walker began working with Troy Barbee of the school's Material Sciences Department to observe the Sun's corona. Walker believed that Barbee's multilayered thin films would provide improved images for an X-ray telescope. In 1987, Barbee and Walker's satellites captured some of the first images of the Sun's corona.

Before his death, Walker was researching X-ray spectroscopy technology. He and his colleagues used this technology to develop three-dimensional images of celestial objects. This new technology was the basis of the dark matter detection method advanced by Professor Blas Cabrera of Stanford's physics department.

== Death and legacy ==
Walker died on April 29, 2001, at home on the Stanford campus, following a battle with cancer. Walker was survived by his second wife Victoria, a daughter, Heather M. M. Walker; two stepsons, Nigel D. Gibbs and Eric D. Gibbs; and four grandchildren.

In 2016, the Astronomical Society of the Pacific instituted an annual Arthur B.C. Walker II Award "established to honor an outstanding scientist whose research and educational efforts substantially contributes to astronomy and who has (1) demonstrated a substantial commitment to mentoring students from underrepresented groups pursuing degrees in astronomy and/or (2) been instrumental in creating or supporting innovative and successful STEM programs designed to support underrepresented students or their teachers"; included is a scholarship to a student of the recipient's choice.
