= Solar Data Analysis Center =

NASA's Solar Data Analysis Center (SDAC) is a data center and repository at NASA/GSFC, responsible for managing and archiving data from scientific heliophysics missions. The center is a major distribution hub for solar images from the SDO and other solar space missions such as SOHO, Hinode and STEREO, and serves as an access point for the Virtual Solar Observatory and many other heliophysics and solar physics resources.
