= Hakeem Oluseyi =

American astrophysicist (born 1967)

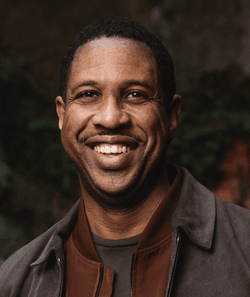
- Oluseyi in 2024
- Born: James Edward Plummer Jr. March 13, 1967 (age 59)
- Education: Tougaloo College (BS); Stanford University (MS, PhD)
- Scientific career
- Fields: Physics, astrophysics, cosmology, electrical engineering, science education
- Workplaces: Florida Institute of Technology; NASA; Lawrence Berkeley Laboratory; Applied Materials Inc; Stanford University
- Thesis: Development of a Global Model of the Sun's Atmosphere with a Focus on the Solar Transition Region (2000)
- Doctoral advisor: Arthur B. C. Walker Jr.

Hakeem Muata Oluseyi (born James Edward Plummer Jr.; March 13, 1967) is an American astrophysicist, cosmologist, inventor, educator, science communicator, author, actor, veteran, and humanitarian.

== Early life, family and education ==
Hakeem Oluseyi was born James Edward Plummer Jr. on March 13, 1967. After his parents divorced when he was four years old, he and his mother moved to a different state along the southern border of the US every year. They resided in some of the country's toughest neighborhoods, including the 9th Ward of New Orleans; Watts, Los Angeles, California; Inglewood, California; South Park, Houston, Texas; and Third Ward, Houston, Texas, before settling in rural Mississippi a month before Oluseyi turned 13 years old. He completed middle school and an all-black high school there, in the East Jasper School District, graduating as his high school's valedictorian in 1985.

Oluseyi served in the US Navy until 1986. He credits the Navy with teaching him algebra. He left the Navy with an honorable discharge due to a skin condition from which he had suffered since he was a child. Oluseyi subsequently enrolled in Tougaloo College, a historically black college (HBCU) where he earned Bachelor of Science degrees in physics and mathematics. Oluseyi is a member of Kappa Alpha Psi.

In 1991, he became a graduate student at Stanford University. He considered dropping out of Stanford due to culture shock. Compared with his previous schooling, where "everybody's in the same economic position," Oluseyi recalled that at Stanford, "how you dressed, how you talked, all these sort of things mattered. [. . .] It was really very difficult at first." Oluseyi eventually found a mentor in solar physicist Arthur B. C. Walker Jr., who helped him adjust to the environment, and he completed his schooling at Stanford, earning an M.S. degree in physics in 1995. In recognition of how much his life had changed since his troubled childhood, he changed his name to Hakeem ("wise" in Arabic) Muata ("he who speaks the truth" in Swahili) Oluseyi ("God has done this" in Yoruba) in 1996.

Oluseyi earned his Ph.D. degree in physics from Stanford in 1999. Walker continued to mentor Oluseyi, who instructed him in experimental space research. Under Walker's tutelage, Oluseyi helped to design, build, calibrate, and launch the Multi-Spectral Solar Telescope Array (MSSTA), which pioneered normal incidence extreme ultraviolet and soft x-ray imaging of the Sun's transition region and corona.

== Career ==
From 1999 to 2001, he worked on semiconductor research at Applied Materials. From 2001 to 2004, he was a research fellow at Lawrence Berkeley National Laboratory, working on the Dark Energy Camera and Vera C. Rubin Observatory. From 2007 to 2019, he was on the faculty of the Florida Institute of Technology in the departments of Physics and Space Sciences. His academic rank was distinguished research professor. From 2016 to 2019, he was stationed at NASA Headquarters in Washington DC where he was the Space Sciences education manager for NASA's Science Mission Directorate via the Intergovernmental Personnel Act Mobility Program. Oluseyi was named a Visiting Robinson Professor at George Mason University in 2021, a distinction by which the university recognizes outstanding faculty.

In 2021, he published his autobiography, A Quantum Life: My Unlikely Journey from the Street to the Stars, co-authored with Joshua Horwitz. Oluseyi was the president of the National Society of Black Physicists from 2022-2024. Since 2024 Oluseyi has been CEO of the Astronomical Society of the Pacific. Oluseyi also serves on the Board of Directors of Annual Reviews.

His best known scientific contributions are research on the transfer of mass and energy through the Sun's atmosphere; the development of space-borne observatories for studying astrophysical plasmas and dark energy; and the development of technologies in ultraviolet optics, detectors, computer chips, and ion propulsion.

In 2021, Oluseyi carried out an investigation into the role that former NASA administrator James Webb played in the Lavender Scare of the 1950s and 1960s, after a number of scientists and journalists had raised concerns about the naming of NASA's new space telescope after him. Contrary to the claims of Webb's critics, Oluseyi found there was no evidence that Webb was implicated. His finding was later confirmed by a full report carried out by NASA itself.

== In popular culture ==
Oluseyi appears as a commentator and scientific authority on Science Channel television shows including How the Universe Works, Outrageous Acts of Science, Curiosity, NASA's Unexplained Files, Space's Deepest Secrets, and Strip the Cosmos. He also appeared as a 'bakineering' (baking and engineering) judge on Netflix's Baking Impossible. He appeared on the National Geographic Channel show Evacuate Earth. Oluseyi appeared in the ABC special Truth and Lies: Hubris on the High Seas, which examined the Titan submersible implosion.

He contributed science articles to the news media, including The Washington Post. He lent his voice and scientific expertise to the award-winning science education video game ExoTrex: A Space Science Adventure Game in collaboration with Dig-It! Games.

He co-authored the children's popular science book Discovery Spaceopedia: The Complete Guide to Everything Space.

== Family ==
Oluseyi met his wife, Jessica, at Tougaloo College. They have a daughter. Oluseyi has a son from an earlier relationship.
