= NIXT =

X-ray telescope

The Normal Incidence X-ray Telescope (NIXT) was a sounding rocket payload flown in the 1990s by Leon Golub of the Smithsonian Astrophysical Observatory, to prototype normal-incidence (conventional) optical designs in extreme ultraviolet (EUV) solar imaging.

== History ==
In the EUV, the surface of the Sun appears dark, and hot structures in the solar corona appear bright; this allows study of the structure and dynamics of the solar corona near the surface of the Sun, which is not possible using visible light.

NIXT and its sister rocket, the MSSTA, were the prototypes for all normal-incidence EUV imaging instruments in use today, including SOHO/EIT, TRACE, and STEREO/SECCHI.

In 1989, a NIXT sounding rocket launch detected soft X-rays coming from a solar flare. It was launched when the solar event was detected to allow high resolution imaging of the Sun's corona. Results from the observations were presented in 1990 in different papers. NIXT was launched throughout the early 1990s and a paper summarizing the results from these mission was published in 1996.

A successor program to NIXT, was the TXI (Tunable XUV Imager) sounding rocket program

== See also ==
- List of X-ray space telescopes
- Rapid Acquisition Imaging Spectrograph Experiment
