= Craig Kletzing =

American plasma physicist (1958–2023)

- Born: Craig Allen Kletzing; February 3, 1958; Sacramento, California
- Died: August 10, 2023 (aged 65)
- Education: University of California, Berkeley (B.A.); University of California, San Diego (M.S., Ph.D.)
- Known for: NASA Van Allen Probes mission (EMFISIS); NASA TRACERS mission
- Spouse: Jeanette Welch
- Awards: Fellow of the American Physical Society (2022)
- Scientific career
- Fields: Plasma physics, Space physics
- Thesis: Auroral electron time dispersion (1989)
- Academic advisors: Carl E. McIlwain; Roy B. Torbert

Craig Allen Kletzing (February 3, 1958 – August 10, 2023) was an American plasma physicist and professor at the University of Iowa, known for his work in space plasmas and laboratory plasmas. He conducted pioneering work in kinetic Alfvén waves, developed instruments for various NASA missions, and taught college level physics.

Kletzing was a principal investigator of the Electric and Magnetic Field Instrument Suite and Integrated Science (EMFISIS) unit aboard NASA's Van Allen Probes, and a co-investigator of the electric and magnetic Fields Suite aboard NASA's Magnetospheric Multiscale Mission. In 2019, NASA selected to fund Kletzing's Tandem Reconnection and Cusp Electrodynamics Reconnaissance Satellites (TRACERS) mission proposal as part of the agency's Small Explorer Program.

== Early life and education ==
Kletzing was born in Sacramento, California in 1958.

He received his Bachelor of Arts degree in physics at the University of California, Berkeley in 1981. Subsequently in 1983, he earned his Master's degree in physics, and in 1989, he received his Ph.D. degree in physics, both from the University of California, San Diego. His Ph.D. thesis, titled "Auroral electron time dispersion", examined precipitating electron data in the Earth's ionosphere using a sounding rocket mission.

== Career ==
After receiving his Ph.D., Kletzing briefly worked as a research assistant professor at the University of Alabama in Huntsville before relocating in the same year to an assistant research-track professor position at the University of New Hampshire (UNH) in 1989. In 1995, he was promoted to the position of Associate Research Professor. During his time at UNH, he held a Visiting Scientist appointment at the Max-Planck-Institut fuer extraterrestrische Physik from 1993 to 1994. In 1996, he joined the University of Iowa as a tenure-track associate professor in the Department of Physics & Astronomy, and was subsequently promoted to full professor in 2005. From 2011 to 2019, he held the title of F. Wendell Miller Distinguished Professor. In 2019, he was named the Donald A. and Marie B. Gurnett Chair, an honor he retained until his death.

Kletzing's research focused on space plasmas (a rarefied form of ionized gas that makes up a majority of the matter in the universe), the physics of auroras or Northern/Southern lights, and the dynamics of the Van Allen radiation belts surrounding Earth. While at the University of Iowa, he was a Co-Investigator and led hardware contributions on NASA's Van Allen Probes and Magnetospheric Multiscale satellite missions. Kletzing also led multiple NASA sounding rocket missions. In total, he was involved in over 30 space missions throughout his career and authored or co-authored over 300 publications. His instrument specialty was measuring magnetic and electric fields and waves in space above active aurora and within the radiation belts.

From 2001 to 2006, Kletzing served as the Associate Chair for the Department of Physics & Astronomy at the University of Iowa. He also served on multiple committees, review panels, and organizing bodies within the heliophysics community.

Kletzing had a strong passion for teaching and public outreach, which was exemplified by his many media interviews, including the high-profile Science Friday show on National Public Radio.

In 2019, Kletzing secured the single largest research grant in University of Iowa's history, a $115 million award from NASA to lead the TRACERS spacecraft mission. Scheduled for launch in 2024, TRACERS will study how the solar wind and Earth's magnetic fields interact in a particular spot called the cusp region, dynamically driven by a process called magnetic reconnection.

== Personal life ==
Kletzing was married to Jeanette Welch, whom he met in California. Together, they played in many Iowa City bands throughout his life including Hold My Llama, Bipolar, Brace for Blast, House of Escher, Truffle Pig and, most recently, Fork in the Road.

Kletzing died on August 10, 2023, at the age of 65.

== Awards and honors ==
In 2006, Kletzing was awarded the University of Iowa College of Liberal Arts and Sciences Teaching Award and in 2007 he won the President and Provost Award for Teaching Excellence. In 2008, the university honored him with the Regent's Award for Faculty Excellence.

From 2011 to 2019, Kletzing held the title of F. Wendell Miller Distinguished Professor, and in 2019 was named as the Donald A. and Marie B. Gurnett Chair. In 2022, he delivered the 39th Annual Presidential Lecture at the University of Iowa.

In 2016, Kletzing was invited as a Distinguished Lecturer in the American Physical Society Division of Plasma Physics and in 2022, Kletzing was named as a Fellow of the American Physical Society.
