= Polarimeter to Unify the Corona and Heliosphere =

NASA satellite of the Explorer program

Polarimeter to Unify the Corona and Heliosphere (PUNCH)
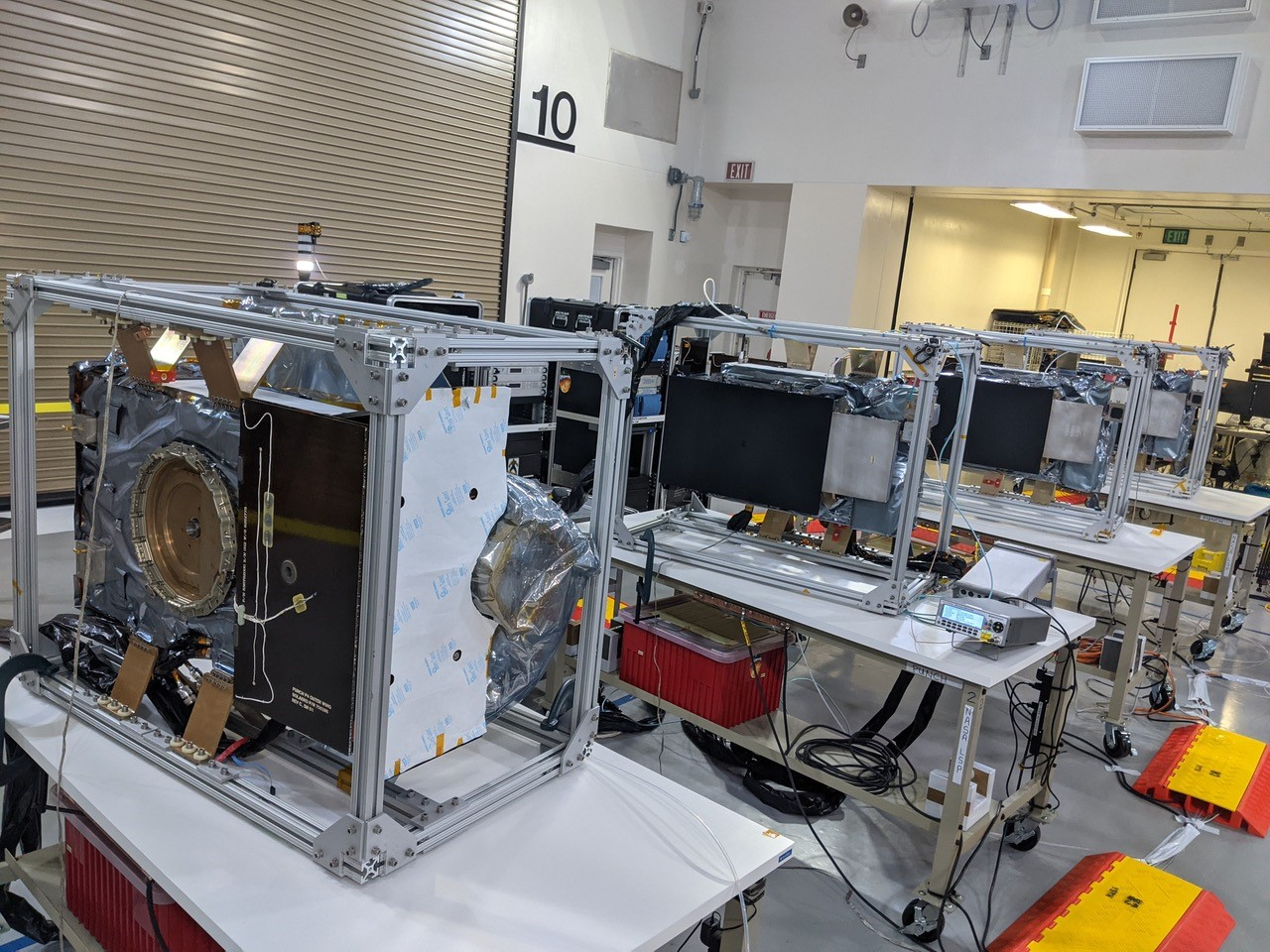
- PUNCH satellites being prepared for launch at Vandenberg Space Force Base in January 2025
- Names: Explorer · SMEX-15
- Mission type: Heliophysics
- Operator: NASA
- COSPAR ID: 2025-047A (NFI); 2025-047B (WFI 1); 2025-047D (WFI 2); 2025-047C (WFI 3)
- Website: punch.spaceops.swri.org

Spacecraft properties
- Spacecraft type: Orbiters × 4
- Bus: Custom, CYGNSS heritage
- Manufacturer: Southwest Research Institute (SwRI)
- Launch mass: 40 kg (88 lb) each 160 kg (350 lb) total

Start of mission
- Launch date: 12 March 2025, 03:10:00 UTC (11 March 2025, 8:10 pm PDT)
- Rocket: Falcon 9 Block 5
- Launch site: Vandenberg, SLC-4E
- Contractor: SpaceX

Orbital parameters
- Reference system: Geocentric orbit
- Regime: Sun-synchronous, low Earth orbit
- Altitude: 570 km (350 mi)

Instruments
- Narrow Field Imager (NFI) – 1 satellite Wide Field Imagers (WFIs) – 3 satellites
- Mission insignia Explorers Program

Polarimeter to Unify the Corona and Heliosphere (PUNCH), also known as SMEX-15, is a mission by NASA to study the unexplored region from the middle of the solar corona out to 1 AU from the Sun. The PUNCH flight assets are a constellation of four microsatellites that through continuous 3D deep-field imaging, will observe the corona and heliosphere as elements of a single, connected system. The four microsatellites were initially scheduled to be launched in October 2023, but were moved to launch alongside (rideshare) the SPHEREx space observatory on a Falcon 9 Block 5 rocket from Vandenberg Space Force Base, from which all five satellites were successfully deployed on 11 March 2025.

On 20 June 2019, NASA announced that PUNCH and TRACERS were the winning candidates to become the next missions in the agency's Small Explorer program (SMEX).

PUNCH is led by Craig DeForest at the Southwest Research Institute (SwRI) in Boulder, Colorado. Including launch costs, PUNCH is being funded for no more than US$165 million.

On 14 April 2025, PUNCH captured its first image with the Narrow Field Imager (NFI) and one of its three Wide Field Imagers (WFI). Two days later, the remaining two WFIs captured their first image.

== Mission ==
The stated primary objective of PUNCH is "to fully discern the cross-scale physical processes, from microscale turbulence to the evolution of global-scale structures, that unify the solar corona and heliosphere". In other words, the mission aims to understand how the solar corona becomes the solar wind.

The two specific objectives are to understand how coronal structures become the ambient solar wind, and to understand the dynamic evolution of transient structures in the young solar wind. The Principal Investigator, Craig DeForest, thinks that such closer study will also lead to a better understanding of the causes of solar weather events like coronal mass ejections (CMEs), which can damage satellites and disrupt electrical grids and power systems on Earth.

PUNCH will observe the Sun's Alfven surface "24/7 by measuring the motions of tiny blobs (“leaves in the wind”) that flow down toward the Sun".

== Instruments ==
The mission configuration consists of a constellation of four observatories, each carrying one primary instrument.

- The Narrow Field Imager (NFI) sits on only one spacecraft, and is an externally occulted visible-light coronagraph.
- The Wide Field Imagers (WFIs) are side-looking heliospheric imagers with planar-corral baffles that sit on the remaining 3 spacecraft.
- The NFI spacecraft also carries a student-built instrument, the Student Thermal Energetic Activity Monitor (STEAM), which is a solid-state X-ray spectrometer that views the entire Sun as a point source to study the physics of coronal heating and solar flares. While STEAM is present on the PUNCH/NFI spacecraft, it remains switched off due to hardware anomalies during final integration and test.

The fields of view (FoV) of the 3 WFIs overlap slightly with each other and with the NFI, and the instruments' operation is synchronized. The instruments operate through polarized Thomson-scatter imaging of the transition from corona to heliosphere. PUNCH integrates images from its constellation of small satellites into a global composite after each orbit, covering ~6 orders of magnitude dynamic range. Through a stream of these images, PUNCH achieves 3D feature localization and accurate deep field imaging. The mission builds on Cyclone Global Navigation Satellite System (CYGNSS) experience with smallsat constellations.

== Data acquisition ==
To accomplish its science objectives, PUNCH will acquire polarized white-light images over a composite 90° field of view centered on the Sun, i.e. from a few solar radii to 45° from the Sun in all directions. This poses many challenges in data reduction, meaning that the greatest technical challenge of the mission is in ground-processing the images acquired by the four spacecraft.

The PUNCH science objectives require measuring the faint sunlight reflected off electrons contained in the corona and solar wind (the extended K-corona). Ten degrees from the Sun, the K-corona is 1000x fainter than the background stars, requiring precise photometric calibration across the individual cameras, to measure and remove the background starfield, galaxy, and related features—which constitute 99.9% of the light incident on the cameras. The camera images are co-aligned to within 0.03 pixel RMS, requiring precise measurement of the optical distortion of each lens system. Point spread function effects, such as optical coma, are identified and removed in the PUNCH data reduction pipeline; and minor photometric errors introduced by data compression are also tracked and eliminated. Polarimetry of the K-corona is affected by the polarization of the starfield itself, which required developing a novel formalism to enable background subtraction while preserving linear polarimetry.

The primary PUNCH data product is background-subtracted, polarimetric images produced by the constellation on a 4-minute cadence; these images are made available to everyone via NASA's SDAC facility and the Virtual Solar Observatory.

== Collaborations ==
SwRI is collaborating with the Naval Research Laboratory (NRL) and the Rutherford Appleton Laboratory in Oxfordshire, England, United Kingdom.

PUNCH, which will operate in low Earth orbit, will work in synergy with NASA's Parker Solar Probe and ESA's Solar Orbiter.

== Gallery ==
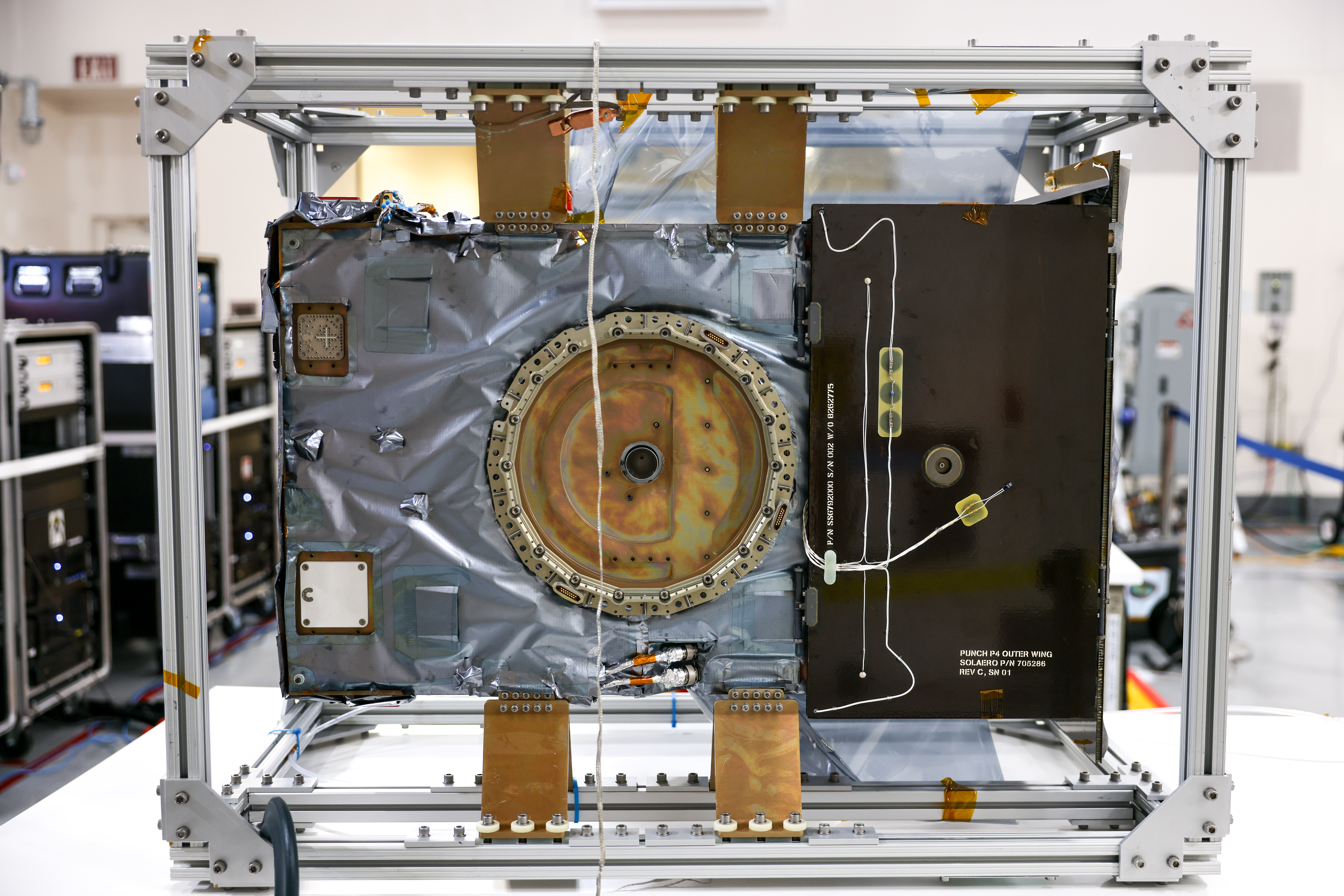
One PUNCH satellite

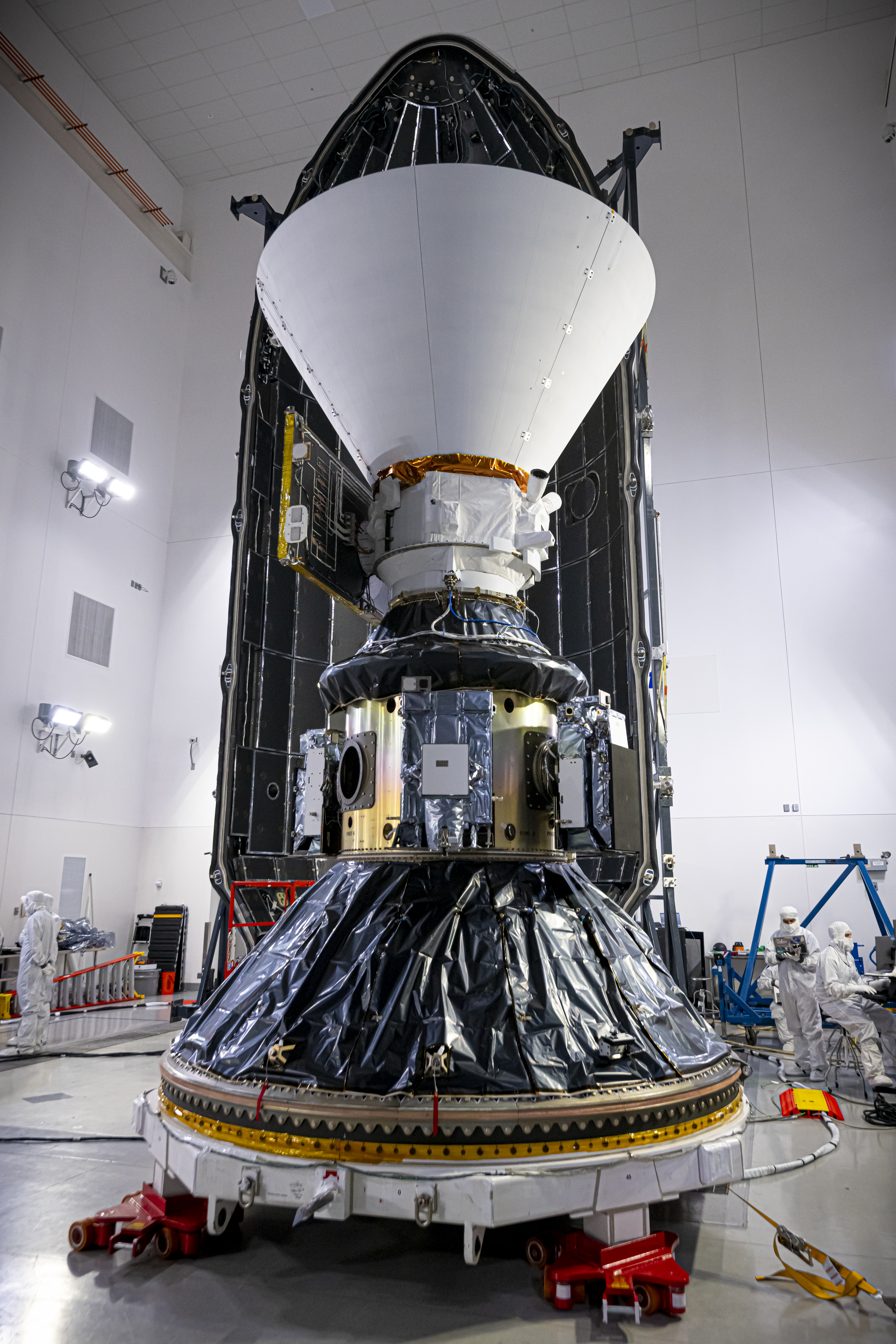
SPHEREx-PUNCH encapsulated

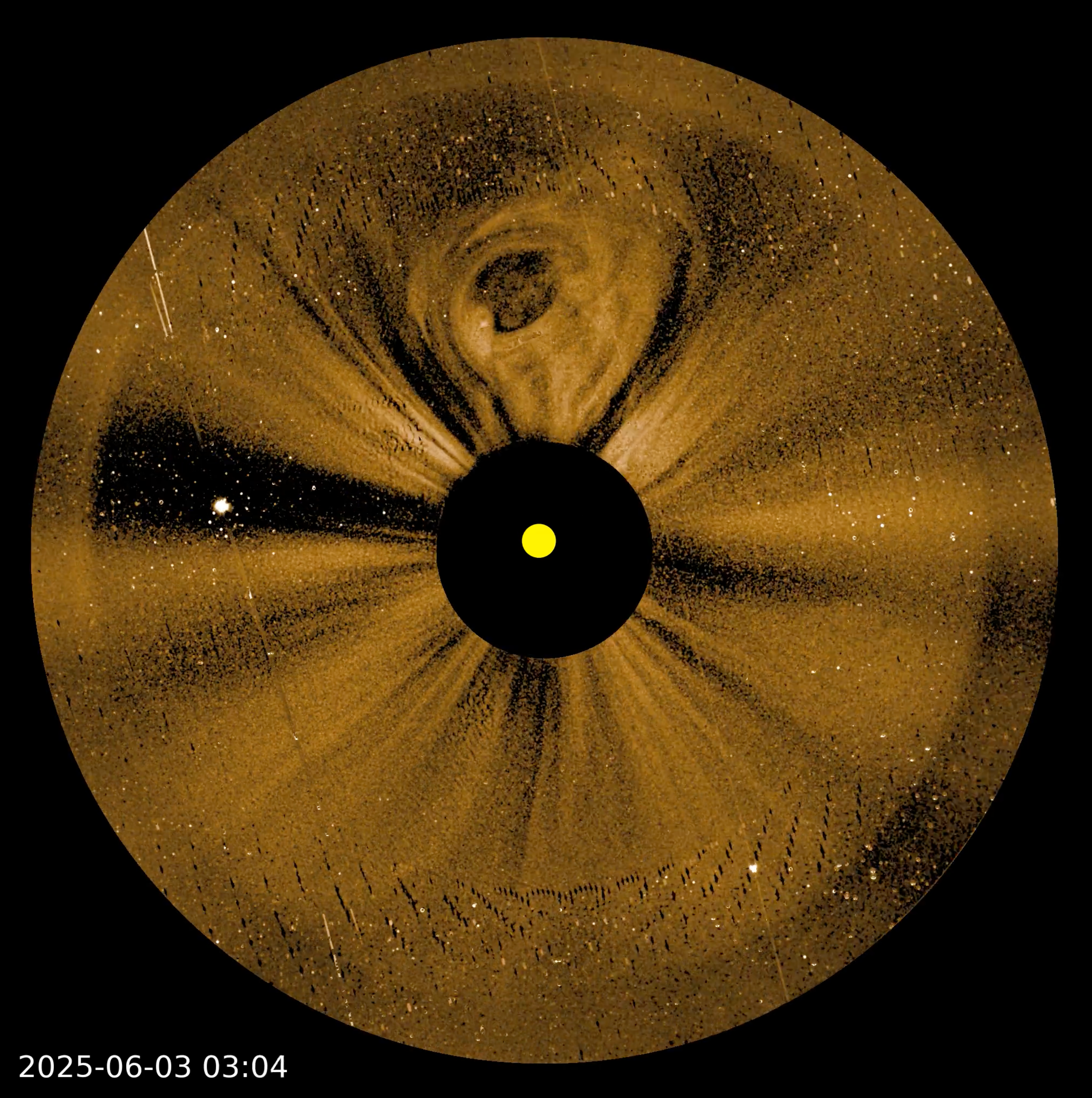
A large coronal mass ejection imaged by the Narrow Field Imager (NFI) camera

Views of coronal mass ejections traveling out from the Sun into the solar system viewed by PUNCH’s three Wide Field Imagers
