= Large Angle and Spectrometric Coronagraph =

The Large Angle and Spectrometric Coronagraph (LASCO) on board the Solar and Heliospheric Observatory satellite (SOHO) consists of three solar coronagraphs with nested fields of view:

- C1 - a Fabry–Pérot interferometer coronagraph imaging from 1.1 to 3 solar radii, non-functional since the 24 June 1998 SOHO Mission Interruption
- C2 - a white light coronagraph imaging from 1.5 to 6 solar radii (orange)
- C3 - a white light coronagraph imaging from 3.7 to 30 solar radii (blue)

The first principal investigator was Dr. Guenter Brueckner. These coronagraphs monitor the solar corona by using an optical system to create, in effect, an artificial solar eclipse. The white light coronagraphs C2 and C3 produce images of the corona over much of the visible spectrum, while the C1 interferometer produces images of the corona in a number of very narrow visible wavelength bands.

== Shutter speed ==
LASCO C3, the clear coronagraph picture, has a shutter time of about 19 seconds. LASCO C2, the orange picture, has a shutter speed of about 26 seconds.

== Resolution ==
The three LASCO cameras have a resolution of one megapixel. The base unit of LASCO's pictures are blocks of 32x32 pixels. If only one bit is missing, as it could occur due to disturbances, the whole block is gated out.

== Disturbances ==
The LASCO instruments have limited technical capabilities compared to more recently developed instruments. They were built in the late 1980s, when digital cameras were an emerging technology. There are two kinds of disturbances that repeatedly occur:

1. Blackouts and Whiteouts, in broken lines, circle-like shapes, or over the whole picture. They are caused by the electronics box. There has never been a firmware update, since it was judged as too sensitive changing the flight-software.
2. Black and white pixels, occurring in patterns, without pattern or alone. Those "missing blocks" are telemetry dropouts, caused by radio interference or a disturbance in the data transfer to Goddard Space Flight Center.

== See also ==
- Extreme ultraviolet Imaging Telescope, another instrument on SOHO
- SOHO 2333
