= Extreme ultraviolet Imaging Telescope =

Optical instrument for ultraviolet images

The Extreme ultraviolet Imaging Telescope (EIT) is an instrument on the SOHO spacecraft used to obtain high-resolution images of the solar corona in the ultraviolet wavelength range. The EIT instrument is sensitive to light of four different wavelengths: 17.1, 19.5, 28.4 and 30.4 nm, corresponding respectively to light produced by highly ionized iron (XI)/(X), (XII), (XV) and helium (II). EIT is built as a single telescope with a quadrant structure to the entrance mirrors: each quadrant reflects a different colour of EUV light, and the wavelength to be observed is selected by a shutter that blocks light from all but the desired quadrant of the main telescope.

The EIT wavelengths are of great interest to solar physicists because they are emitted by the very hot solar corona but not by the relatively cooler photosphere of the Sun; this reveals structures in the corona that would otherwise be obscured by the brightness of the Sun itself. EIT was originally conceived as a viewfinder instrument to help select observing targets for the other instruments on board SOHO, but EIT is credited with a good fraction of the original science to come from SOHO, including the first observations of traveling wave phenomena in the corona, characterization of coronal mass ejection onset, and determination of the structure of coronal holes. Before mid-2010, EIT obtained an Fe XII (19.5 nm wavelength) image of the Sun about four times an hour, around the clock; these were immediately uplinked as time-lapse movies to the SOHO web site for immediate viewing by anyone who is interested. (Since the summer of 2010, when Thorpe commissioning of the Solar Dynamics Observatory was completed, its Atmospheric Imaging Assembly has been able to take much higher resolution solar images much more frequently. The white-light coronagraphs on SOHO are thus able to take images more frequently: they share a CPU and telemetry bandwidth with EIT. The images are used for long-duration studies of the Sun, for detailed structural analyses of solar features, and for real-time space weather prediction by the NOAA Space Weather Prediction Center.

== Technology ==
EIT is the first long-duration instrument to use normal incidence multilayer coated optics to image the Sun in extreme ultraviolet. This portion of the spectrum is extremely difficult to reflect, as most matter absorbs the light very strongly. Conventionally these wavelengths have been reflected either using grazing incidence (as in a Wolter telescope for imaging X-rays) or a diffraction grating (as in the jocularly-termed overlappograph flown on Skylab in the mid-1970s). Modern vacuum deposition technology allows mirrors to be coated with extremely thin layers of nearly any material. The multilayer mirrors in an EUV telescope are coated with alternate layers of a light "spacer" element (such as silicon) that absorbs EUV light only weakly, and a heavy "scatterer" element (such as molybdenum) that absorbs EUV light very strongly. Perhaps 100 layers of each type might be placed on the mirror, with a thickness of around 10 nm each. The layer thickness is tightly controlled, so that at the desired wavelength, reflected photons from each layer interfere constructively. In this way, reflectivities of up to ~50% can be attained.

The multilayer technology allows conventional telescope forms (such as the Cassegrain or Ritchey–Chrétien designs) to be used in a novel part of the spectrum. Solar imaging with multilayer EUV optics was pioneered in the 1990s by the MSSTA and NIXT sounding rockets, each of which flew on several five-minute missions into space. Multilayer EUV optics are also used in terrestrial nanolithography rigs for fabrication of microchips.

The EIT detector is a conventional CCDs that are back-illuminated and specially thinned to admit the EUV photons. Because the detector is about equally sensitive to EUV and visible photons, and the Sun is about one billion (10^{9}) times brighter in visible light than in EUV, special thin foil filters are used to block the visible light while admitting the EUV. The filters are made of extremely thin aluminum foil, about 200 nm (0.2 micrometre) thick, and transmit about half of the incident EUV light while absorbing essentially all of the incident visible light.

== History ==
EIT was a difficult sell to the scientific funding agencies, as it was not clear in the early 1990s that simple imaging of the corona would be scientifically useful (most of the other instruments on board SOHO are spectrographs of various kinds). The EIT PI, Jean-Pierre Delaboudiniere, was forced to scrounge funding and resources from several locations to construct and launch the instrument. For example, EIT alone of the SOHO instruments does not have its own flight computer; it is connected to the LASCO instrument flight computer, and is treated operationally as an additional LASCO camera. No funding was available for a pointing adjustment mechanisms, so EIT is bolted directly to the spacecraft and hence forms the SOHO pointing reference: the other instruments all align themselves to the EIT images. Focus adjustment is achieved by thermal expansion: the internal survival heaters (found in most spaceborne instruments) are used to achieve microscopic changes in the size of the telescope structure and hence the mirror spacing. EIT was originally allocated only about 1 kbit/s of data—about the same speed as a 110 baud teletype—but after its utility became clear much more telemetry bandwidth was allocated to it.

== Related instruments ==
The technology in EIT is based on prototype instruments that were flown on the sounding rocket payloads MSSTA and NIXT. The first multilayer telescope to image the full disk of the Sun in EUV was flown by A.B.C. Walker and team in 1987. The TRACE, STEREO, and Proba-2 spacecraft (launched in 1998, 2006, and 2009, respectively) carry similar multilayer imagers, as does the Solar Dynamics Observatory mission.
