= Magnetospheric Multiscale Mission =

Four NASA robots studying Earth's magnetosphere (2015-present)

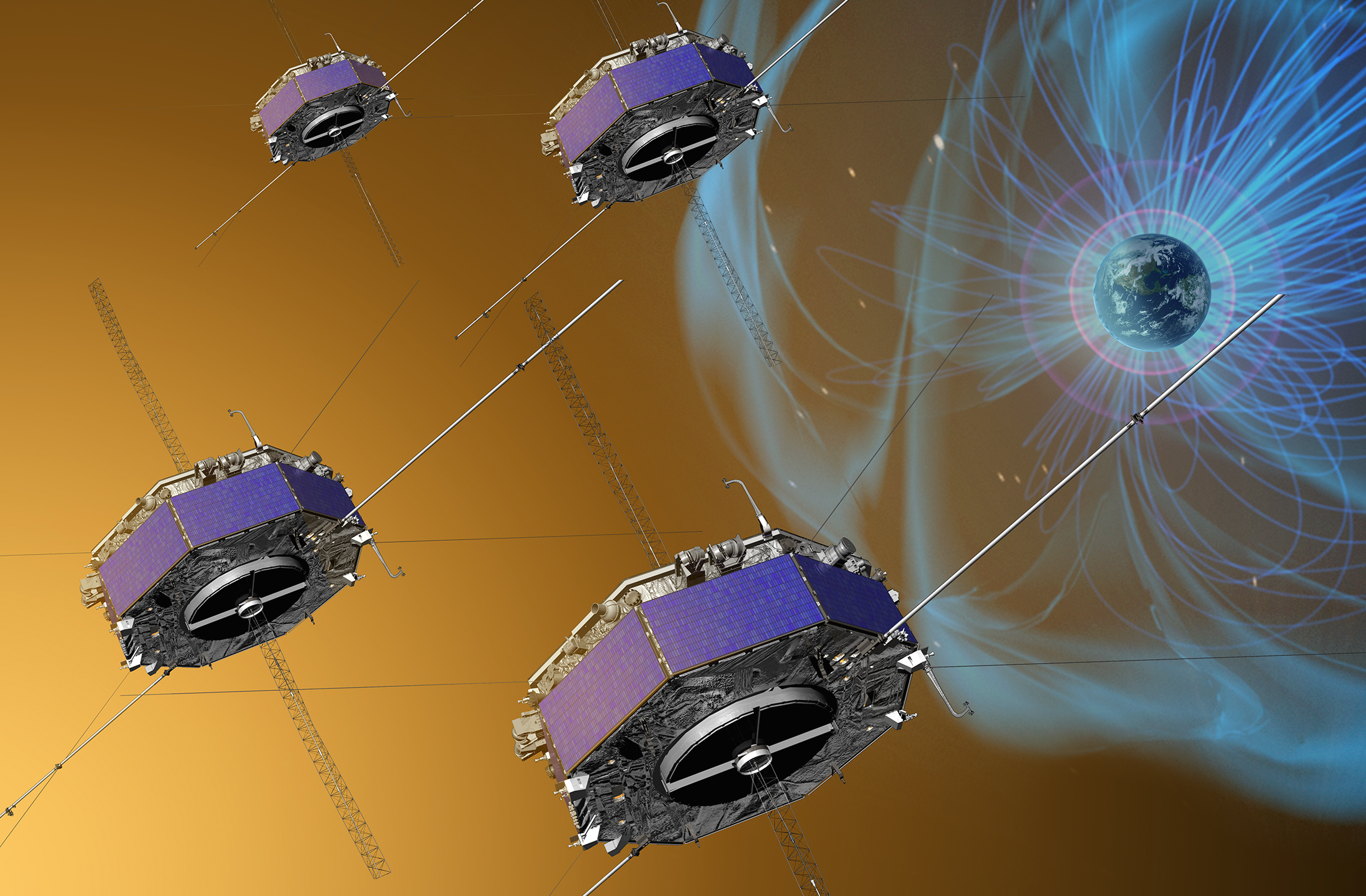
- Artist depiction of MMS spacecraft
- Names: MMS
- Mission type: Magnetosphere research
- Operator: NASA
- COSPAR ID: 2015-011A; 2015-011B; 2015-011C; 2015-011D
- SATCAT no.: 40482; 40483; 40484; 40485
- Website: www.nasa.gov/mission_pages/mms/index.html
- Mission duration: Planned: 2 years Elapsed: 11 years, 8 months, 3 days

Spacecraft properties
- Manufacturer: Goddard Space Flight Center
- Launch mass: 1,360 kg (3,000 lb)
- Dimensions: Stowed: 3.5 × 1.2 m (11.5 × 3.9 ft); Deployed: 112 × 29 m (367 × 95 ft)
- Power: 318 watts

Start of mission
- Launch date: 13 March 2015, 02:44 UTC
- Rocket: Atlas V 421; AV-053
- Launch site: Cape Canaveral, SLC-41
- Contractor: United Launch Alliance
- Entered service: September 2015

End of mission
- Last contact: 2040 (planned)

Orbital parameters
- Reference system: Geocentric orbit
- Regime: Highly elliptical orbit
- Perigee altitude: 2,550 km (1,580 mi)
- Apogee altitude: Day phase: 70,080 km (43,550 mi); Night phase: 152,900 km (95,000 mi)
- Inclination: 28.0°
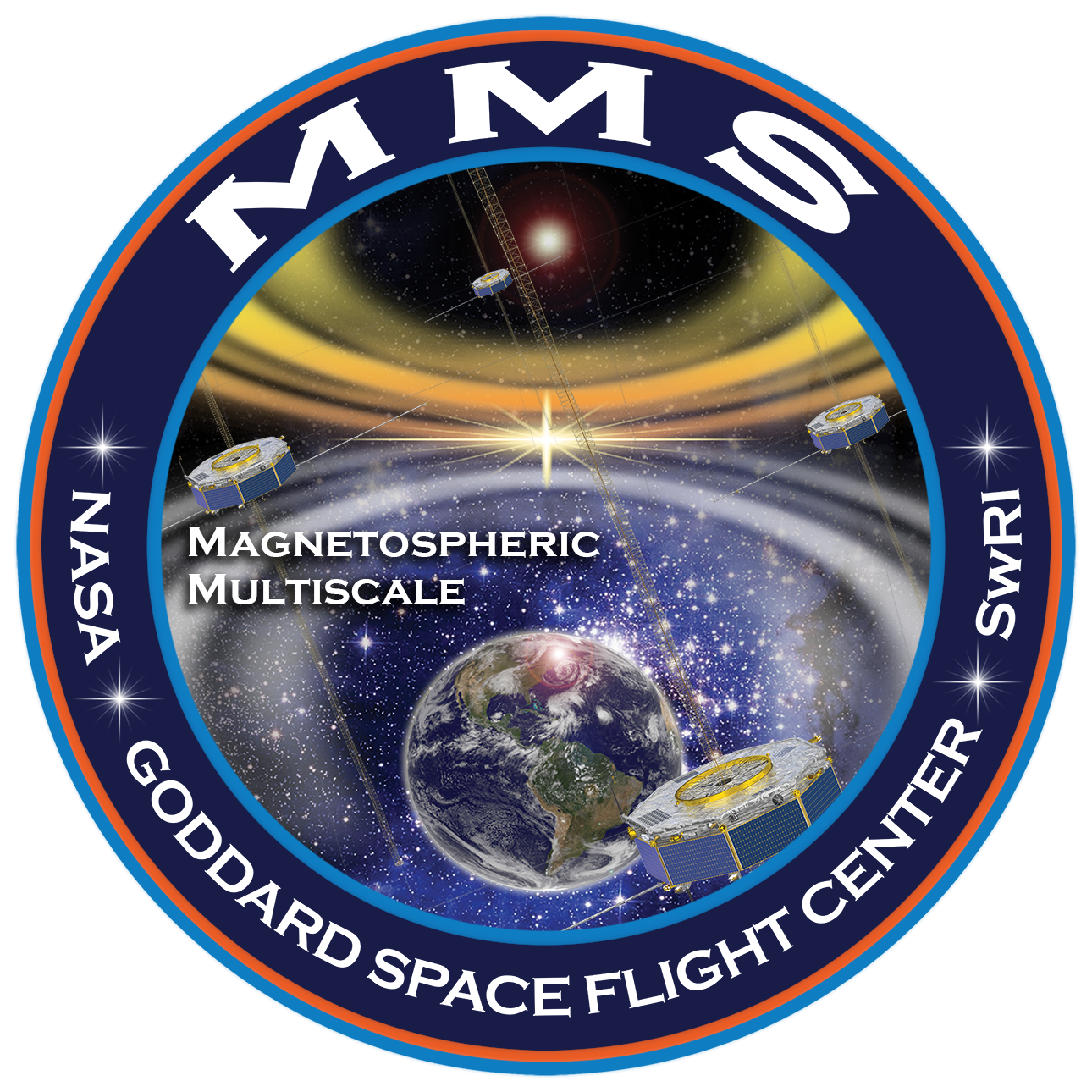
- Large Strategic Science Missions; Heliophysics Division Solar Terrestrial Probes program

The Magnetospheric Multiscale (MMS) Mission is a NASA robotic space mission to study the Earth's magnetosphere, using four identical spacecraft flying in a tetrahedral formation. The spacecraft were launched on 13 March 2015 at 02:44 UTC. The mission is designed to gather information about the microphysics of magnetic reconnection, energetic particle acceleration, and turbulence — processes that occur in many astrophysical plasmas. As of March 2020, the MMS spacecraft has enough fuel to remain operational until 2040.

== Background ==
The mission builds upon the premise of the ESA Cluster mission, but MMS instrumentation surpasses it in spatial resolution and in temporal resolution, allowing for the first time measurements of the critical electron diffusion region, the site where magnetic reconnection occurs. Its orbit is optimized to spend extended periods in locations where reconnection is known to occur: at the dayside magnetopause, the place where the pressure from the solar wind and the planets' magnetic field are equal; and in the magnetotail, which is formed by pressure from the solar wind on a planet's magnetosphere and which can extend great distances away from its originating planet.

In order to resolve the three-dimensional structure of magnetic reconnection at varying spatial scales, the four identical MMS spacecraft orbit the Earth in a tetrahedral formation with adjustable separation distances. This enables simultaneous sampling of the plasma and fields at multiple points in space to measure spatial gradients and temporal variations. Such measurements are essential for quantifying terms in Maxwell's equations that describe the evolution of the electromagnetic fields, and makes it possible to distinguish between spatial and temporal structures. The capability for multi-point measurements is crucial for studying magnetic reconnection and cannot be achieved with a single-spacecraft mission.

Magnetic reconnection in Earth's magnetosphere is one of the mechanisms responsible for the aurora, and it is important to the science of controlled nuclear fusion because it is one mechanism preventing magnetic confinement of the fusion fuel. These mechanisms are studied in outer space by the measurement of motions of matter in stellar atmospheres, like that of the Sun. Magnetic reconnection is a phenomenon in which energy may be efficiently transferred from a magnetic field to the motion of charged particles.

== Spacecraft ==
MMS mission overview video

Visualization of the spacecraft orbit transition

The MMS mission consists of four spacecraft. Each has a launch mass of 1,360 kg (3,000 lb). In their stowed launch configuration, each are approximately 3.5 by 1.2 m (11.5 by 3.9 ft), and when stacked together they have a total height of 4.9 m (16 ft). After being deployed in orbit, a total of eight axial and wire booms are deployed, including four Spin-Plane Double Probe (SDP) wire booms each 60 m (200 ft) long.

The MMS spacecraft are spin stabilized, turning at a rate of three revolutions per minute to maintain orientation. Each spacecraft contains 12 thrusters connected to four hydrazine fuel tanks. Position data is provided by highly sensitive GPS equipment, while attitude is maintained by four star trackers, two accelerometers, and two Sun sensors.

The mission is broken into three phases. The commissioning phase will last approximately five and a half months after launch, while the science phases will last two years. The first science phase will focus on the magnetic boundary between the Earth and Sun (day side operations) for one and a half years, with the spacecraft formation orbiting the Earth at 2,550 by 70,080 km (1,580 by 43,550 mi). The second science phase will study reconnection in Earth's magnetic tail (night side operations) for half a year, increasing the orbit to 2,550 by 152,900 km (1,580 by 95,010 mi).

== Instruments ==
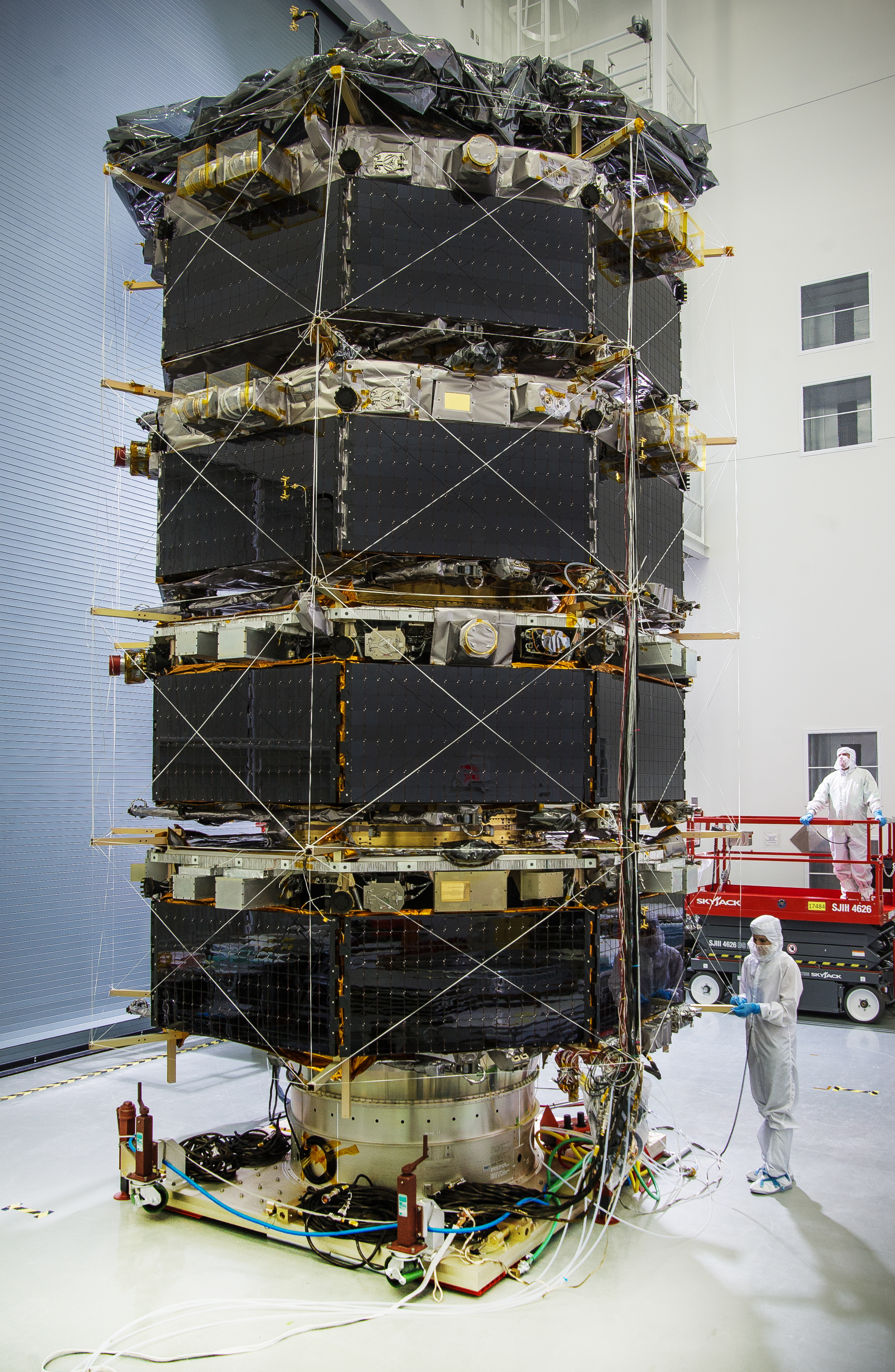
Satellites stacked before launch

Each spacecraft carries several experiments, divided into three suites: the Hot Plasma Suite, the Energetic Particles Detector Suite, and the Fields Suite.

=== Hot Plasma Suite ===
The Hot Plasma Suite measures plasma particle counts, directions, and energies during reconnection. It consists of two instruments:

- Fast Plasma Investigation (FPI), a set of four dual electron spectrometers (DES) and four dual ion spectrometers (DIS).
- Hot Plasma Composition Analyzer (HPCA), detects particle speed in order to determine its mass and type.

=== Energetic Particles Detector ===
The Energetic Particles Detector Suite detects particles at energies far exceeding those detected by the Hot Plasma Suite. It consists of two instruments:

- Fly's Eye Energetic Particle Sensor (FEEPS), a set of silicon solid state detectors to measure electron energy. Between two FEEPS per spacecraft, the individual detectors are arranged to provide 18 different view angles simultaneously; hence the term "fly's eye".
- Energetic Ion Spectrometer (EIS), measures energy and total velocity of detected ions in order to determine their mass. The EIS can detect helium and oxygen ions at energies higher than that of the HPCA.

=== Fields Suite ===
The Fields Suite measures magnetic and electric field characteristics. It consists of six instruments:

- Analog Fluxgate magnetometer (AFG), determines the strength of magnetic fields.
- Digital Fluxgate magnetometer (DFG), determines the strength of magnetic fields.
- Electron Drift Instrument (EDI), measures electric and magnetic field strength by sending a beam of electrons into space and measuring how long it takes the electrons to circle back in the presence of these fields.
- Spin-plane Double Probe (SDP), consists of electrodes on the end of four 60 m (200 ft) wire booms that extend from the spacecraft to measure electric fields.
- Axial Double Probe (ADP), a set of electrodes on two 15 m (49 ft) antennas mounted axially on the spacecraft.
- Search Coil Magnetometer (SCM), an induction magnetometer used to measure magnetic fields.

== Personnel and development ==
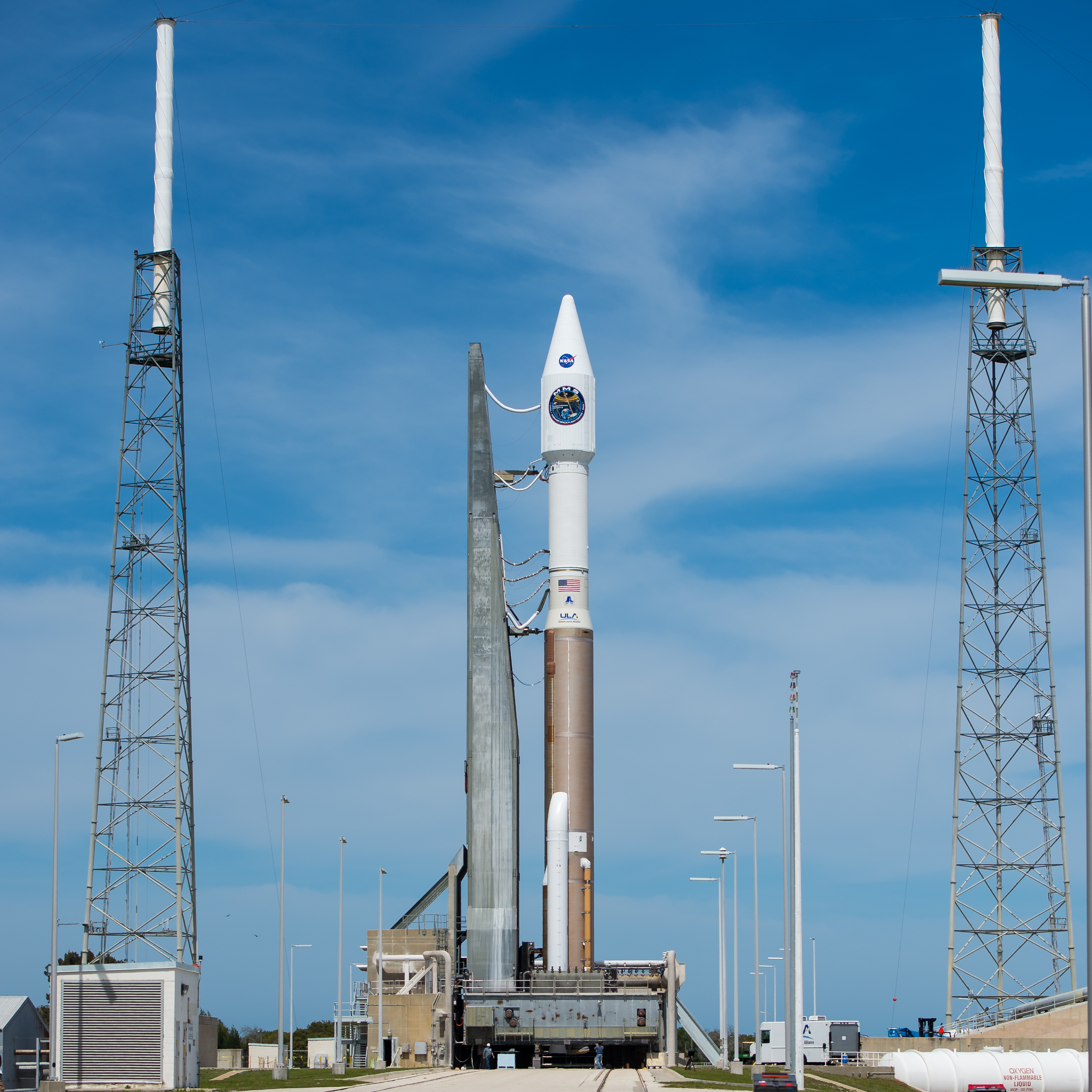
Atlas V launch vehicle

MMS finds magnetic reconnection in turbulent plasma.

The principal investigator is James L. Burch of Southwest Research Institute, assisted by an international team of investigators, both instrument leads and theory and modeling experts. The project scientist is Thomas E. Moore of Goddard Space Flight Center. Education and public outreach is a key aspect of the mission, with student activities, data sonification, and planetarium shows being developed.

The mission was selected for support by NASA in 2005. System engineering, spacecraft bus design, integration and testing has been performed by Goddard Space Flight Center in Maryland. Instrumentation is being improved, with extensive experience brought in from other projects, such as the IMAGE, Cluster and Cassini missions. In June 2009, MMS was allowed to proceed to Phase C, having passed a Preliminary Design Review. The mission passed its Critical Design Review in September 2010. The spacecraft launched on an Atlas V 421 launch vehicle, in March 2015.

== Formation flying ==
In order to collect the desired science data, the four satellite MMS constellation must maintain a tetrahedral formation through a defined region of interest in a highly elliptical orbit. The formation is maintained through the use of a high altitude rated GPS receiver, Navigator, to provide orbit knowledge, and regular formation maintenance maneuvers. Through Navigator, the MMS mission broke the Guinness World Record twice for highest altitude fix of a GPS signal (at 70,000 km (43,000 mi) and 187,200 km (116,300 mi) above the surface in 2016 and 2019 respectively).

== Discoveries ==
In 2016, the MMS mission was the first to directly detect magnetic reconnection, the phenomenon which drives space weather in the Earth's magnetosphere.

MMS has since detected magnetic reconnection occurring in unexpected places. In 2018, MMS made the first-ever detection of magnetic reconnection in the magnetosheath, a region of space previously thought to be too chaotic and unstable to sustain reconnection. Magnetic flux ropes and Kelvin–Helmholtz vortices are other phenomena where MMS has detected reconnection events against expectations.

In August 2019, astronomers reported that MMS made the first high-resolution measurements of an interplanetary shock wave from the Sun.

A 2025 paper reported detection of a magnetic switchback in Earth's magnetic field with data from MMS.

== See also ==
- IMAGE, the Imager for Magnetopause-to-Aurora Global Exploration, a prior magnetosphere research satellite
- PUNCH
- TRACERS
