= Craig Edward DeForest =

American astrophysicist (born 1968)

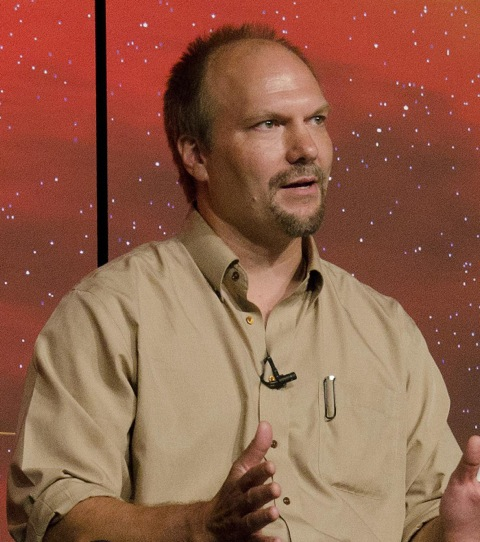
- DeForest in 2013
- Born: 1968 (age 57–58); San Diego, California, U.S.
- Education: Reed College (B.A.), Stanford University (Ph.D.)
- Occupation: Heliophysicist
- Known for: Solar Physicist

Craig Edward DeForest (born 1968) is an American heliophysicist and the former Chair of the American Astronomical Society's Solar Physics Division. He is Director of the Department of Solar and Heliospheric Physics at the Boulder, Colorado offices of the Southwest Research Institute. His wide-ranging contributions to the field of experimental astrophysics of the Sun include: early work on the MSSTA, a sounding rocket that prototyped modern normal-incidence EUV optics such as are used on the Solar Dynamics Observatory; his discovery of sound waves in the solar corona in 1998; standardization of computer vision techniques that are used to measure and track magnetic fields on the solar surface; co-invention with colleague Charles Kankelborg of the fluxon semi-Lagrangian approach to numerical MHD modeling; and pioneering work on quantitative remote sensing of the solar wind via Thomson scattered light.

DeForest is noted outside the heliophysics science community for his contributions to open-source software, in particular PDL and Audacity; and for his extensive work on science outreach to the public.

DeForest is the Principal Investigator of the PUNCH mission that launched 2025 to study the solar corona and the origin of the solar wind.
