= Guenter Brueckner =

Physicist (1934–1998)

Guenter E. Brueckner (1934–1998) was a solar physicist who spent much of his career at the US Naval Research Lab. His life's efforts included research into aspects of the sun relevant to radio signal quality, terrestrial weather, space weather and applications of plasmas such as in fusion energy. He is known for work on coronal mass ejections; various innovations in solar observing optical systems, in particular the Skylab mission, design and development (with John-David F. Bartoe) of the Solar Ultraviolet Spectral Irradiance Monitor (SUSIM) on the Upper Atmosphere Research Satellite (UARS); and for being the principal investigator for the LASCO instrument.

In the 1970s, he worked with Richard Tousey to make several notable observations including the coronal mass ejections mentioned above, lithium ions in solar flares, and various other things.
