= TRACERS =

NASA heliophysics spacecraft

Tandem Reconnection and Cusp Electrodynamics Reconnaissance Satellites
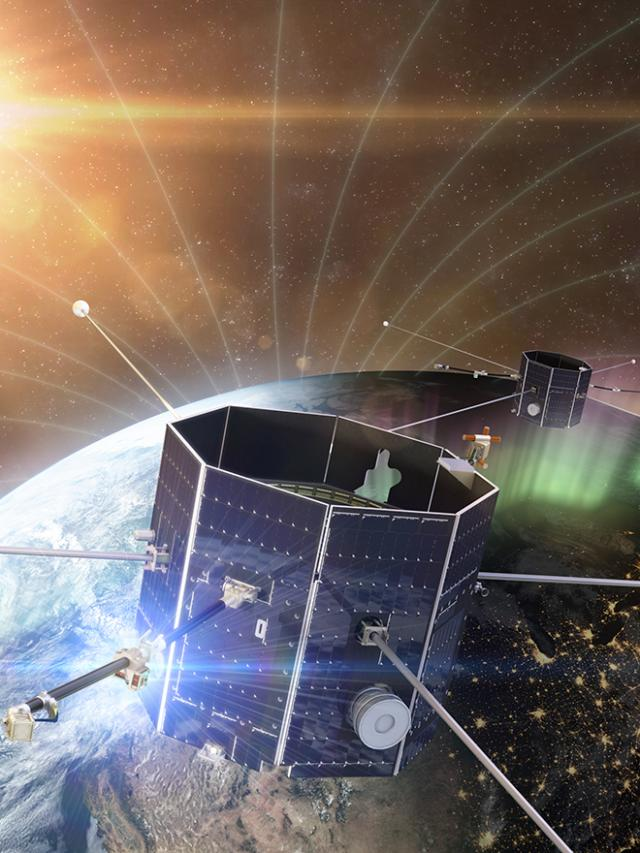
- Names: TRACERS
- Mission type: Heliophysics
- Operator: NASA
- Website: tracers.physics.uiowa.edu

Spacecraft properties
- Spacecraft: TRACERS
- Spacecraft type: Orbiters (2)
- Manufacturer: Millennium Space Systems

Start of mission
- Launch date: July 23, 2025 18:13 UTC (11:13 am PDT)
- Rocket: Falcon 9 Block 5
- Launch site: Vandenberg Space Launch Complex 4
- Contractor: SpaceX

Orbital parameters
- Reference system: Geocentric orbit
- Regime: Low Earth orbit Polar
- Altitude: 600 km (370 mi)
- TRACERS logo Small Explorer program (SMEX)

Tandem Reconnection and Cusp Electrodynamics Reconnaissance Satellites (TRACERS) is an orbiter mission tasked to study the origins of the solar wind and how it affects Earth. TRACERS was proposed by Craig A. Kletzing at the University of Iowa who served as Principal Investigator until his death in 2023. David M. Miles at the University of Iowa was named as Principal Investigator in his stead. The TRACERS mission received 115 million USD in funding from NASA.

== Overview ==
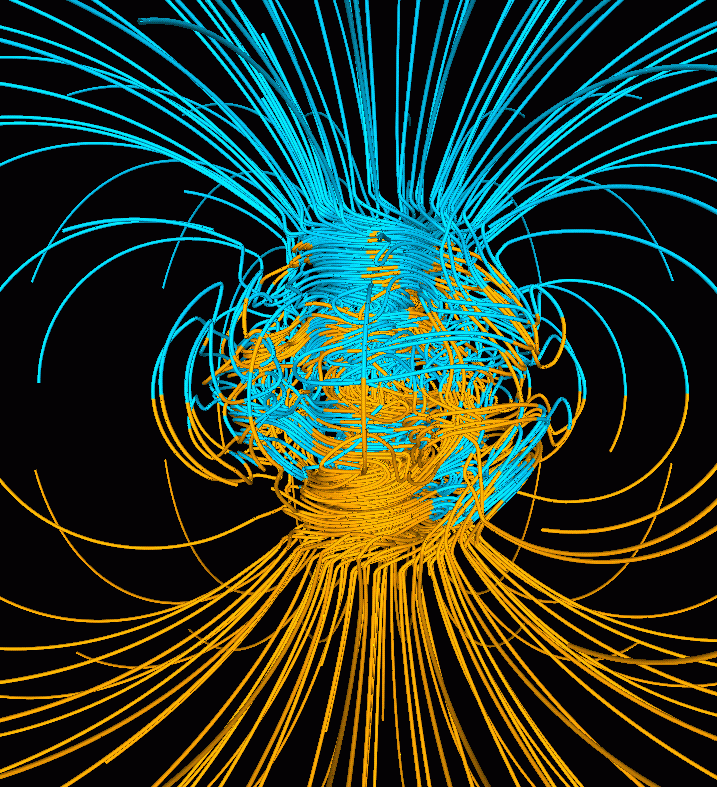
A computer simulation of the Earth's magnetic field. The lines represent magnetic field lines, blue when the field points towards the center and yellow when away.

TRACERS is a mission by NASA that aims to answer long-standing questions critical to understanding the Sun-Earth System. TRACERS is a pair of identically instrumented spinning spacecraft that will study how the Sun's solar wind interacts with the Earth's magnetosphere. TRACERS was initially planned to be launched as a secondary mission to another orbiter, Polarimeter to Unify the Corona and Heliosphere (PUNCH). PUNCH will study the solar wind, a stream of charged particles emanating from the Sun, while TRACERS will study Earth's response.

To study magnetic reconnection at Earth’s magnetopause, TRACERS will fly through the polar cusp, a point where Earth’s magnetic field dips down toward the ground. There, particles funnel through the cusp into a concentrated part of our atmosphere.

TRACERS observes solar particles interacting with Earth's magnetic field at the northern magnetic cusp region. In the cusp, the field lines act as a guide to particles moving from the boundary between Earth's magnetic field down into the atmosphere. In a process known as magnetic reconnection, the field lines violently reconfigure, sending particles out at speeds that can approach the speed of light. Some of these particles will be guided by the Earth's field into the region where TRACERS can observe them. TRACERS studies a longstanding question about where reconnection happens at the magnetopause and how the solar wind affects its place and timing, helping NASA better forecast the influx of energetic particles into Earth's magnetic field that has the potential to disrupt the power grid and satellite communications. TRACERS and PUNCH will work together with the other existing heliophysics spacecraft.

== History ==
On 20 June 2019, NASA announced that PUNCH and TRACERS were the winning candidates to become the next missions in the agency's Small Explorer program. On 29 September 2023 NASA Launch Services Program selected SpaceX's Falcon 9 rocket to provide the launch service for TRACERS launch through the Venture-Class Acquisition of Dedicated and Rideshare (VADR) program.

TRACERS was launched on 23 July 2025 at 18:13 UTC from Vandenberg Space Force Base in California. Both Space Vehicles 1 and 2 were successfully deployed at T+01:35:02 and T+01:39:37. Instruments will slowly be activated throughout the following weeks.

On 25 July 2025, NASA announced that commissioning of the TRACERS spacecraft would be paused as teams investigate why "routine adjustments to the power subsystem" did not achieve the "desired results" on one of the two satellites.

On 11 September 2025, NASA has confirmed that communication has been restored with SV1, one of two TRACERS satellites, that had a power subsystem problem two days after launch. The other spacecraft, SV2, completed post-launch commissioning without issue.

== Instruments ==
- DC Magnetometer (MAG) a fluxgate magnetometer that provides measurements of the background magnetic field up to 5 Hz will be provided by University of California, Los Angeles.
- Search coil magnetometer (MSC) a three-axis magnetic search coil to measure AC magnetic field from 2 Hz up to 1 kHz will be provided by University of Iowa.
- Electric Field Instrument (EFI) a two-axis electric field experiment to measure electric fields from 1 Hz to 1 kHz.will be provided by University of California, Berkeley.
- Analyzer for Cusp Electrons (ACE) an electrostatic analyzer to measure cusp electrons from 40 eV to 10 keV will be provided by University of Iowa.
- Analyzer for Cusp Ions (ACI) is an electrostatic analyzer to measure cusp ions from 50 eV to 10 keV.
- A technology demonstration, Magnetometers for Innovation and Capability (MAGIC), was added in 2020 with the goal to test prototype magnetic-field instruments.

== See also ==
- Heliophysics
- Magnetospheric Multiscale Mission
- Solar storm
