= Phoebus group =

The Phoebus group is an international team of European, Japanese and American scientists aiming at detecting the solar g modes. As of October 5, 2009, the group has finally produced a review summarising the work performed over the past 12 years.

== Scientific Rationale ==
Since the beginnings of global helioseismology in the late 1970s, the detection of g modes has been the quest for the Grail. The detection of g modes would be key to the understanding of the internal structure and dynamics of the solar core, as much as the p modes are key to that of the structure of the radiative and convective zones. The impact of g-mode detection would be so large that we could expect a wealth of information to be returned. The structure and dynamics of the energy-generating core will be seen, analyzed and understood. The hydrostatic structure of the core, in particular its deepest lying layers, will be uncovered to a far higher level of accuracy and precision; while it will be possible to infer the rotational characteristics of the core, characteristics that at present we are unable to uncover, to a satisfactory level of precision, with the current p-mode data.

This quest was a major driver in the design of very precise and quiet instrumentation harboured by spacecraft such as the Solar and Heliospheric Observatory (SoHO. Aboard SOHO, there are three instruments dedicated to helioseismology all aiming at detecting g modes. A few years after the launch of SoHO in end 1995, it was realized that g modes would not be easily detected.

== Sequence of events ==
In 1997, a consortium of helioseismologists was formed with the simple goal of detecting g modes. Helioseismologists belonging to the SOHO consortia and to ground-based networks were teaming together for that goal. This consortium of helioseismologists was named the Phoebus group after Gaston Phoebus, Comte de Foix, who wrote a book about hunting, hoping thereby to 'catch' a few g modes. The work focused on data analysis of SOHO instruments (VIRGO, MDI) and ground-based networks (BiSON, Global Oscillations Network Group); on probability and statistics; and on theoretical model prediction of g-mode amplitudes and frequencies.

The group met at ESTEC, Noordwijk (The Netherlands) during a series of five workshops that were held on 3–7 November 1997 (1st), on 26–30 October 1998 (2nd), on 25–29 October 1999 (3rd), on 7–11 June 2001 (4th), on 17–21 June 2002 (5th). Following the move of Thierry Appourchaux to the Institut d'Astrophysique Spatiale, the workshop were organized at ISSI under the auspices of Vittorio Manno and Roger-Maurice Bonnet. The group then met in Bern on 31 October - 4 November 2005 (6th), on 27–31 March 2006 (7th) (in Fréjus) and on 23–24 April 2007 (8th).

== Current Membership ==
Following, different interests in the search, a few members of the original group departed and were replaced. A major change occurred in 2004 with the inclusion of several members of the GOLF consortium. As of 2009, the members are as follows:

- Bo Andersen, Norwegian Space Center, Norway
- Thierry Appourchaux, Institut d'Astrophysique Spatiale, France
- Frédéric Baudin, Institut d'Astrophysique Spatiale, France
- Patrick Boumier, Institut d'Astrophysique Spatiale, France
- Kévin Belkacem, Observatoire de Paris-Meudon, France
- Anne-Marie Broomhall, University of Warwick, United Kingdom
- William Chaplin, University of Birmingham, United Kingdom
- Yvonne Elsworth, University of Birmingham, United Kingdom
- Wolfgang Finsterle, World Radiation Center, Davos, Switzerland
- Claus Fröhlich†, World Radiation Center, Davos, Switzerland
- Alan Gabriel, Institut d'Astrophysique Spatiale, France
- Rafael A. Garcia, Laboratoire AIM, Saclay, France
- Douglas Gough, Cambridge University
- Gérard Grec, Observatoire de la Côte d'Azur, France
- Guenter Houdek, Universitat Wien
- Antonio Jiménez, Instituto de Astrofisica de Canarias, Spain
- Alexander Kosovichev, Stanford University
- Janine Provost, Observatoire de la Côte d'Azur, France
- Takashi Sekii, National Astronomical Observatory of Japan
- Thierry Toutain, on leave from CNRS
- Sylvaine Turck-Chièze, Laboratoire AIM, Saclay, France

== Past Membership ==
In the life of the group the following members timely contributed:

- Gabrielle Berthomieu, Observatoire de la Côte d'Azur, France
- Todd Hoeksema, Stanford University
- George Isaak, University of Birmingham, United Kingdom
- Phil Sherrer, Stanford University
- Richard Wachter, World Radiation Center, Switzerland

== Referred articles ==
- Appourchaux, T.; Pallé, P. L. (2013), "The History of the g-mode Quest", in K. Jain; S.C. Tripathy; F. Hill; J.W. Leibacher; A.A. Pevtsov (eds.), Fifty Years of Seismology of the Sun and Stars. Proceedings of a Workshop held 6–10 May, ASP Conference Proceedings, vol. 478, Astronomical Society of the Pacific, p. 125, arXiv:1309.3835, Bibcode:2013ASPC..478..125A
- Appourchaux, T.; Belkacem, K.; Broomhall, A.-M.; Chaplin, W. J.; Gough, D. O.; Houdek, G.; Provost, J.; Baudin, F.; Boumier, P.; Elsworth, Y.; García, R. A.; Andersen, B. N.; Finsterle, W.; Fröhlich, C.; Gabriel, A.; Grec, G.; Jiménez, A.; Kosovichev, A.; Sekii, T.; Toutain, T.; Turck-Chièze, S. (2010), "The quest for the solar g modes", Astronomy and Astrophysics Review, 18 (1–2): 197–277, arXiv:0910.0848, Bibcode:2010A&ARv..18..197A, doi:10.1007/s00159-009-0027-z
- Appourchaux, T.; Fröhlich, C.; Andersen, B.; Berthomieu, G.; Chaplin, W. J.; Elsworth, Y.; Finsterle, W.; Gough, D. O.; Hoeksema, J. T.; Isaak, G. R.; Kosovichev, A. G.; Provost, J.; Scherrer, P. H.; Sekii, T.; Toutain, T. (2000), "Observational Upper Limits to Low-Degree Solar g-Modes", Astrophysical Journal, 538 (1): 401–414, Bibcode:2000ApJ...538..401A, doi:10.1086/309124
- Gabriel, A. H.; Baudin, F.; Boumier, P.; García, R. A.; Turck-Chièze, S.; Appourchaux, T.; Bertello, L.; Berthomieu, G.; Charra, J.; Gough, D. O.; Pallé, P. L.; Provost, J.; Renaud, C.; Robillot, J.-M.; Roca, Cortés T.; Thiery, S.; Ulrich, R. K. (2002), "A search for solar g modes in the GOLF data", Astronomy and Astrophysics, 390 (3): 1119, Bibcode:2002A&A...390.1119G, doi:10.1051/0004-6361:20020695
- García, R. A.; Turck-Chièze, S.; Jiménez-Reyes, S. J.; Ballot, J.; Pallé, P. L.; Eff-Darwich, A.; Mathur, S.; Provost, J. (2007), "Tracking Solar Gravity Modes: The Dynamics of the Solar Core", Science, 316 (5831): 1591–1593, Bibcode:2007Sci...316.1591G, doi:10.1126/science.1140598, PMID 17478682
- Turck-Chiéze, S.; García, R. A.; Couvidat, S.; Ulrich, R. K.; Bertello, L.; Varadi, F.; Kosovichev, A. G.; Gabriel, A. H.; Berthomieu, G.; Brun, A. S.; Lopes, I.; Palléé, P.; Provost, J.; Robillot, J. M.; Roca, Cortés T. (2004), "Looking for Gravity-Mode Multiplets with the GOLF Experiment aboard SOHO", Astrophysical Journal, 604 (1): 455–468, Bibcode:2004ApJ...604..455T, doi:10.1086/381743
- Wachter, R.; Schou, J.; Kosovichev, A. G.; Scherrer, P. H. (2003), "Optimal Masks for Solar g-Mode Detection", Astrophysical Journal, 588 (2): 1199, Bibcode:2003ApJ...588.1199W, doi:10.1086/374302
