= TRACE =

NASA satellite of the Explorer program

Transition Region and Coronal Explorer
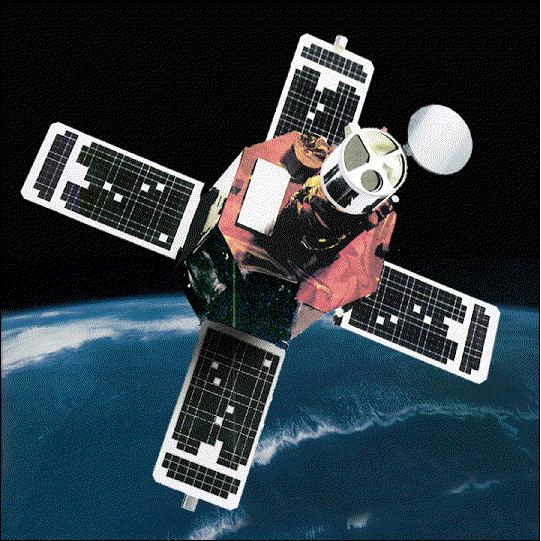
- Names: Explorer-73; SMEX-4; TRACE
- Mission type: Heliophysics
- Operator: NASA / GSFC
- COSPAR ID: 1998-020A
- SATCAT no.: 25280
- Website: TRACE
- Mission duration: 1 year (planned); 12 years, 2 months and 19 days (achieved)

Spacecraft properties
- Spacecraft: Explorer LXXIII
- Spacecraft type: Transition Region and Coronal Explorer
- Bus: TRACE
- Manufacturer: Goddard Space Flight Center
- Launch mass: 250 kg (550 lb)
- Dimensions: 1.9 × 1.1 m (6 ft 3 in × 3 ft 7 in)
- Power: 220 watts

Start of mission
- Launch date: 2 April 1998, 02:42:39 UTC
- Rocket: Pegasus XL (F21)
- Launch site: Vandenberg, Stargazer
- Contractor: Orbital Sciences Corporation
- Entered service: 20 April 1998

End of mission
- Deactivated: 21 June 2010, 23:56 UTC
- Decay date: 18 July 2025, 11:37 UTC

Orbital parameters
- Reference system: Geocentric orbit
- Regime: Sun-synchronous orbit
- Perigee altitude: 520.0 km (323.1 mi)
- Apogee altitude: 547.2 km (340.0 mi)
- Inclination: 97.84°
- Period: 95.48 minutes

Instruments
- TRACE Imaging Telescope
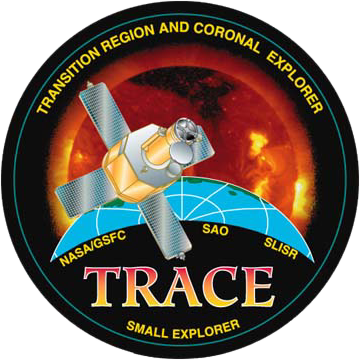
- TRACE mission patch SMEX program Explorer program

Transition Region and Coronal Explorer (TRACE, or Explorer 73, SMEX-4) was a NASA heliophysics and solar observatory designed to investigate the connections between fine-scale magnetic fields and the associated plasma structures on the Sun by providing high-resolution images and observation of the solar photosphere, the transition region, and the solar corona. A main focus of the TRACE instrument was the fine structure of coronal loops low in the solar atmosphere. TRACE was the third spacecraft in the Small Explorer program, launched on 2 April 1998, and obtained its last science image on 21 June 2010, at 23:56 UTC. It reentered the atmosphere 600 km south of Perth, Australia on 18 July 2025, at 11:37 UTC.

== Mission ==
The Transition Region and Coronal Explorer (TRACE) was a NASA small explorer mission designed to examine the three-dimensional magnetic structures which emerge through the Sun's photosphere (the visible surface of the Sun) and define both the geometry and dynamics of the upper solar atmosphere (the transition region and corona). Its primary science objectives were to: (1) follow the evolution of magnetic field structures from the solar interior to the corona; (2) investigate the mechanisms of the heating of the outer solar atmosphere; and, (3) determine the triggers and onset of solar flares and mass ejections.

== Spacecraft ==
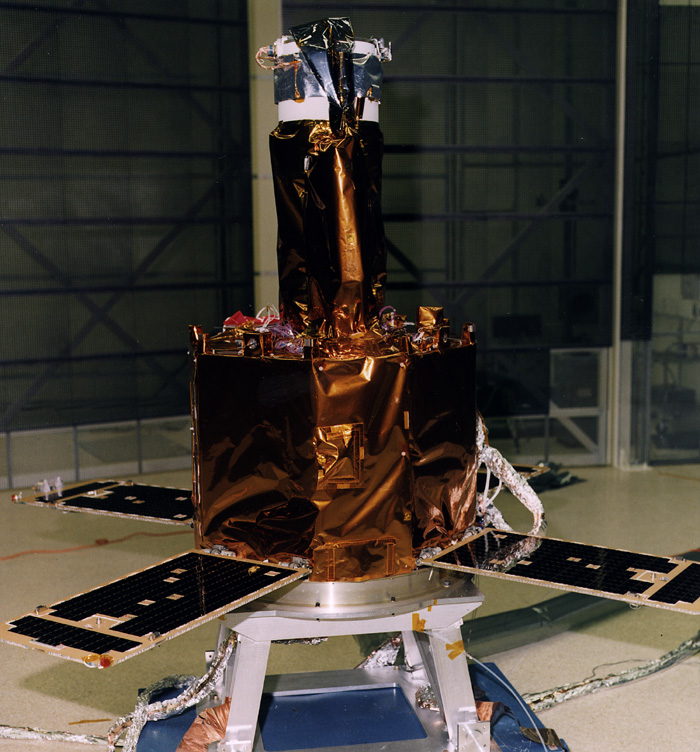
TRACE in cleanroom during assembly

The satellite was built by NASA's Goddard Space Flight Center. Its telescope was constructed by a consortium led by Lockheed Martin's Advanced Technology Center. The optics were designed and built to a state of the art surface finish by the Smithsonian Astrophysical Observatory (SAO). The telescope had a 30 cm (12 in) aperture and 1024 × 1024 charge-coupled device (CCD) detector giving an 8.5 arcminute field of view (FoV). The telescope was designed to take correlated images in a range of wavelengths from visible light through the Lyman alpha line to far ultraviolet. The different wavelength passbands corresponded to plasma emission temperatures from 4,000 to 4,000,000 K. The optics used a special multilayer technique to focus the difficult-to-reflect extreme ultraviolet (EUV) light; the technique was first used for solar imaging in the late 1980s and 1990s, notably by the MSSTA and NIXT sounding rocket payloads.

TRACE was a single-instrument, three-axis stabilized spacecraft. The spacecraft attitude control system (ACS) utilized three magnetic-torquer coils, a digital Sun sensor, six coarse Sun sensors, a three-axis magnetometer, four reaction wheels, and three two-axis inertial gyros to maintain pointing. In science mode, the spacecraft used an instrument-provided guide telescope as a fine guidance sensor to provide a pointing accuracy of less than 5 arcseconds. Power was provided to the spacecraft through the use of four panels of gallium arsenide (GaAs) solar cells with a total area of 2 m^{2} (22 sq ft). The solar array actually produced power of around 220 watts, 85 W of which was used each orbit by the spacecraft and 35 W of which was used by the instrument each orbit. The remaining power was used for operational and decontamination heating of the spacecraft and telescope. A 9 A-hour nickel–cadmium battery (NiCd) provided energy during time when the spacecraft was in the Earth's shadow. Communications were provided via a 5 W S-band transponder, providing up to 2.25 Mbit/s downlink data transmission and 2 kbit/s uplink. Data were transmitted up to six times daily. Data were stored onboard using a solid-state recorder capable of holding up to 300 MB. The command and data handling system used a 32-bit 80386/80387 processor.

== Experiment ==
=== TRACE Imaging Telescope ===
The telescope was of Cassegrain design, 1.6 m (5 ft 3 in) long with an aperture of 30 cm (12 in). The focal length was 8.66 m (28.4 ft). The field of view of the telescope was 8.5 x 8.5 arcminutes with a spatial resolution of one arcsecond. The light was focused on a 1024 x 1024 element CCD detector (0.5 arcseconds/pixel). The temporal resolution of the instrument was less than 1 second, although the nominal temporal resolution was 5 seconds. Exposure times for observations ranged between 2 ms and 260 seconds. The primary and secondary mirrors had normal-incidence coatings specially designed for EUV and UV observations which divide the mirrors into quadrants. These segmented coatings were designed to provide identically sized and perfectly coaligned images. Which mirror quadrant was used for an observation was determined by the position of a quadrant selector shutter mechanism, positioned behind the entrance aperture. Three of the mirror coatings provided for observations in specific iron emission bands: Fe IX (central wavelength/bandwidth: 17.3 nm/0.64 nm); Fe XII (19.5 nm/0.65 nm); and Fe XV (28.4 nm/1.07 nm). The final mirror coating allowed broadband observations in the ultraviolet (centered on 500 nm). Further selection of observations in the UV could be made through the use of a filter wheel, mounted in front of the CCD. The filter wheel permitted continuum observations (170 nm/20 nm) as well as observations in emission bands for C (carbon) I and Fe II (160 nm/27.5 nm), C IV (155 nm/2 nm), and H (Hydrogen) I (Lyman-alpha) (121.6 nm/8.4 nm). The TRACE primary mirror assembly was based on primary mirror support assemblies used in SWATH, a small explorer developed for the U.S. Air Force, and NIXT, a set of rocket flights flown by the Smithsonian Astrophysical Observatory (SAO) five times between 1983 and 1993. Many of the designs and some of the space flight hardware from the MDI instrument on Solar and Heliospheric Observatory (SoHO) was also used.

== Image gallery ==
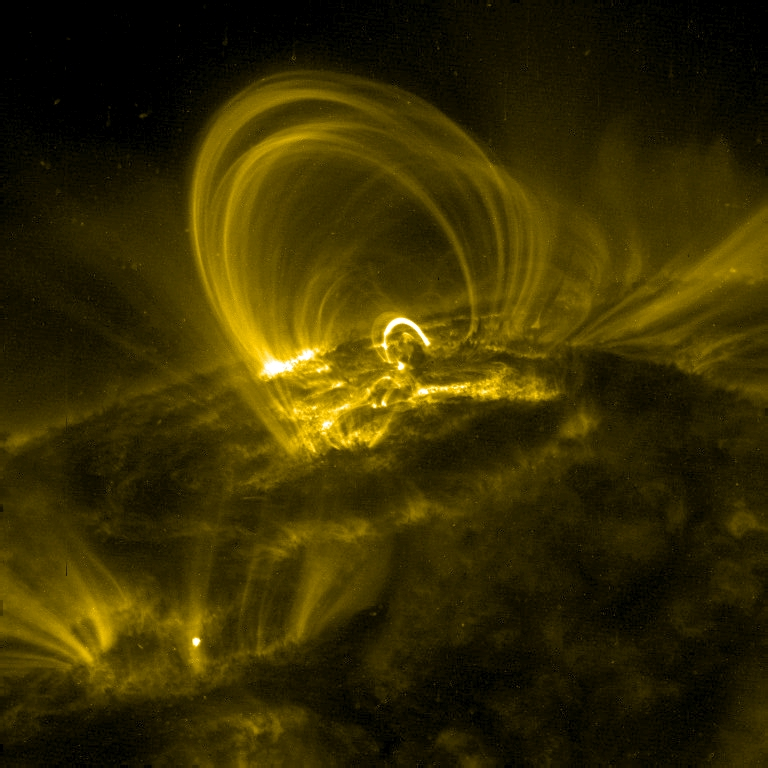
TRACE image of some typical million Kelvin loops

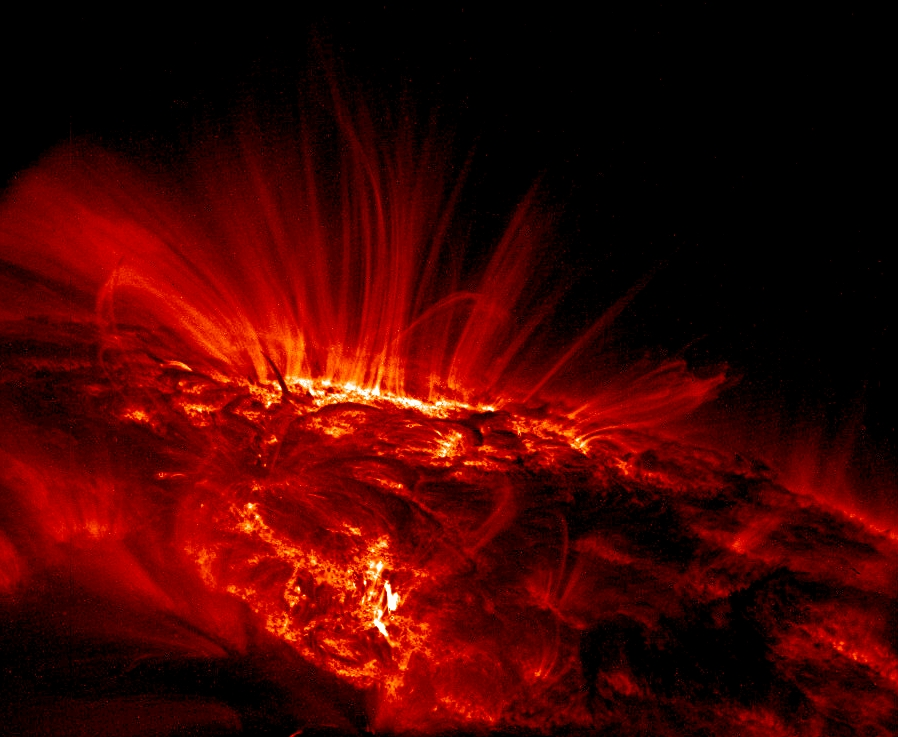
Image of a sunspot taken by TRACE

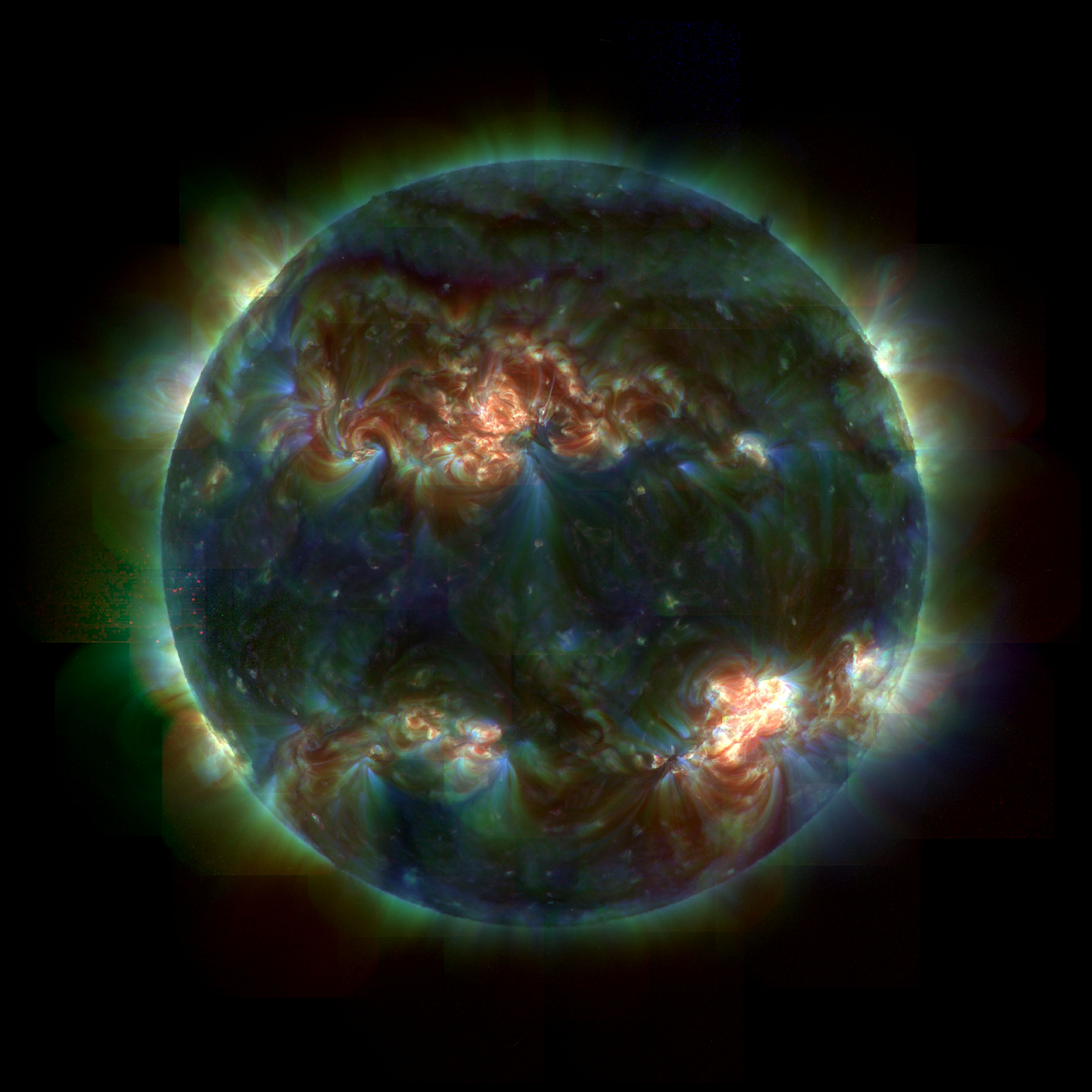
TRACE mosaic of the full-disk Sun

== See also ==
- Explorer program
