= Solar and Heliospheric Observatory =

European space observatory

Solar and Heliospheric Observatory (SOHO)
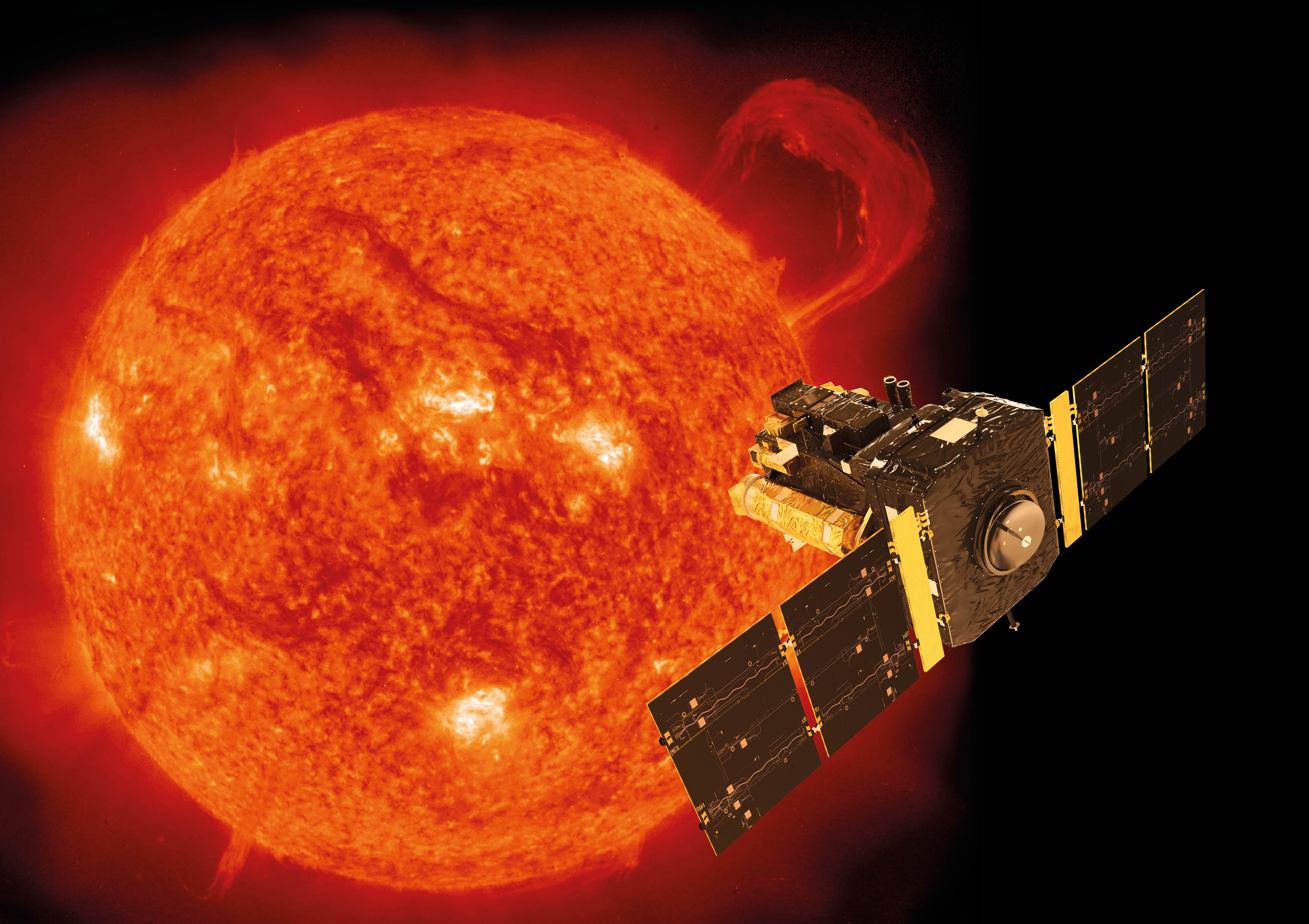
- Artist's rendering of the SOHO spacecraft
- Names: SOHO
- Mission type: Solar observation
- Operator: ESA / NASA
- COSPAR ID: 1995-065A
- SATCAT no.: 23726
- Website: Official website
- Mission duration: 3 years (planned); 30 years, 11 months and 15 days (in progress)

Spacecraft properties
- Bus: SOHO
- Manufacturer: Matra Marconi Space
- Launch mass: 1,864 kg (4,109 lb)
- Payload mass: 610 kg (1,340 lb)
- Dimensions: 4.3 × 2.7 × 3.65 m (14.1 × 8.9 × 12.0 ft); 9.5 m (31 ft) with solar arrays deployed
- Power: 1500 watts

Start of mission
- Launch date: 2 December 1995, 08:08:01 UTC
- Rocket: Atlas IIAS (AC-121)
- Launch site: Cape Canaveral, LC-36B
- Contractor: Lockheed Martin
- Entered service: May 1996

Orbital parameters
- Reference system: Sun–Earth L_{1} orbit
- Regime: Halo orbit
- Perigee altitude: 206,448 km (128,281 mi)
- Apogee altitude: 668,672 km (415,494 mi)
Instruments
- CDS: Coronal Diagnostic Spectrometer
- CELIAS: Charge, Element, Isotope Analysis
- COSTEP: Comprehensive Suprathermal & Energetic Particle Analyzer
- EIT: Extreme UV Imaging Telescope
- ERNE: Energetic and Relativistic Nuclei and Electron experiment
- GOLF: Global Oscillations at Low Frequencies
- LASCO: Large Angle Spectrometer Coronagraph
- MDI: Michelson Doppler Imager
- SUMER: Solar UV Measurement of Emitted Radiation
- SWAN: Solar Wind Anisotropies
- UVCS: UV Coronagraph and Spectrometer
- VIRGO: Variability of Solar Irradiance and Gravity Oscillations
- ESA insignia (2020s) Horizon 2000 (Science Programme)

The Solar and Heliospheric Observatory (SOHO) is a European Space Agency (ESA) spacecraft built by a European industrial consortium led by Matra Marconi Space (now Airbus Defence and Space) that was launched on a Lockheed Martin Atlas IIAS launch vehicle on 2 December 1995, to study the Sun. It has also discovered more than 5,000 comets. It began normal operations in May 1996. It is a joint project between the ESA and NASA. SOHO was part of the International Solar Terrestrial Physics Program (ISTP). Originally planned as a two-year mission, SOHO continues to operate after 30 years in space; the mission has been extended until year 2029, subject to review and confirmation by ESA's Science Programme Committee.

In addition to its scientific mission, it is a main source of near-real-time solar data for space weather prediction. Along with Aditya-L1, Wind, Advanced Composition Explorer (ACE), Deep Space Climate Observatory (DSCOVR) and other satellites, SOHO is one of five spacecraft in the vicinity of the Earth–Sun L1 point, a point of gravitational balance located approximately 0.99 astronomical unit (AU) from the Sun and 0.01 AU from the Earth. In addition to its scientific contributions, SOHO is distinguished by being the first three-axis-stabilized spacecraft to use its reaction wheels as a kind of virtual gyroscope; the technique was adopted after an on-board emergency in 1998 that nearly resulted in the loss of the spacecraft.

== Scientific objectives ==
The three main scientific objectives of SOHO are:

- Investigation of the outer layer of the Sun, which consists of the chromosphere, transition region, and the corona. The instruments CDS, EIT, LASCO, SUMER, SWAN, and UVCS are used for this solar atmosphere remote sensing.
- Making observations of solar wind and associated phenomena in the vicinity of L_{1}. CELIAS and COSTEP are used for "in situ" solar wind observations.
- Probing the interior structure of the Sun. GOLF, MDI, and VIRGO are used for helioseismology.

== Orbit ==
Animation of SOHO's trajectory

Polar view

Equatorial view

Earth · SOHO

The SOHO spacecraft is in a halo orbit around the Sun–Earth L1 point, the point between the Earth and the Sun where the balance of the (larger) Sun's gravity and the (smaller) Earth's gravity is equal to the centripetal force needed for an object to have the same orbital period in its orbit around the Sun as the Earth, with the result that the object will stay in that relative position.

Although sometimes described as being at L1, the SOHO spacecraft is not exactly at L1 as this would make communication difficult due to radio interference generated by the Sun, and because this would not be a stable orbit. Rather it lies in the (constantly moving) plane, which passes through L1 and is perpendicular to the line connecting the Sun and the Earth. It stays in this plane, tracing out an elliptical halo orbit centred about L1. It orbits L1 once every six months, while L1 itself orbits the Sun every 12 months as it is coupled with the motion of the Earth. This keeps SOHO in a good position for communication with Earth at all times.

== Communication with Earth ==
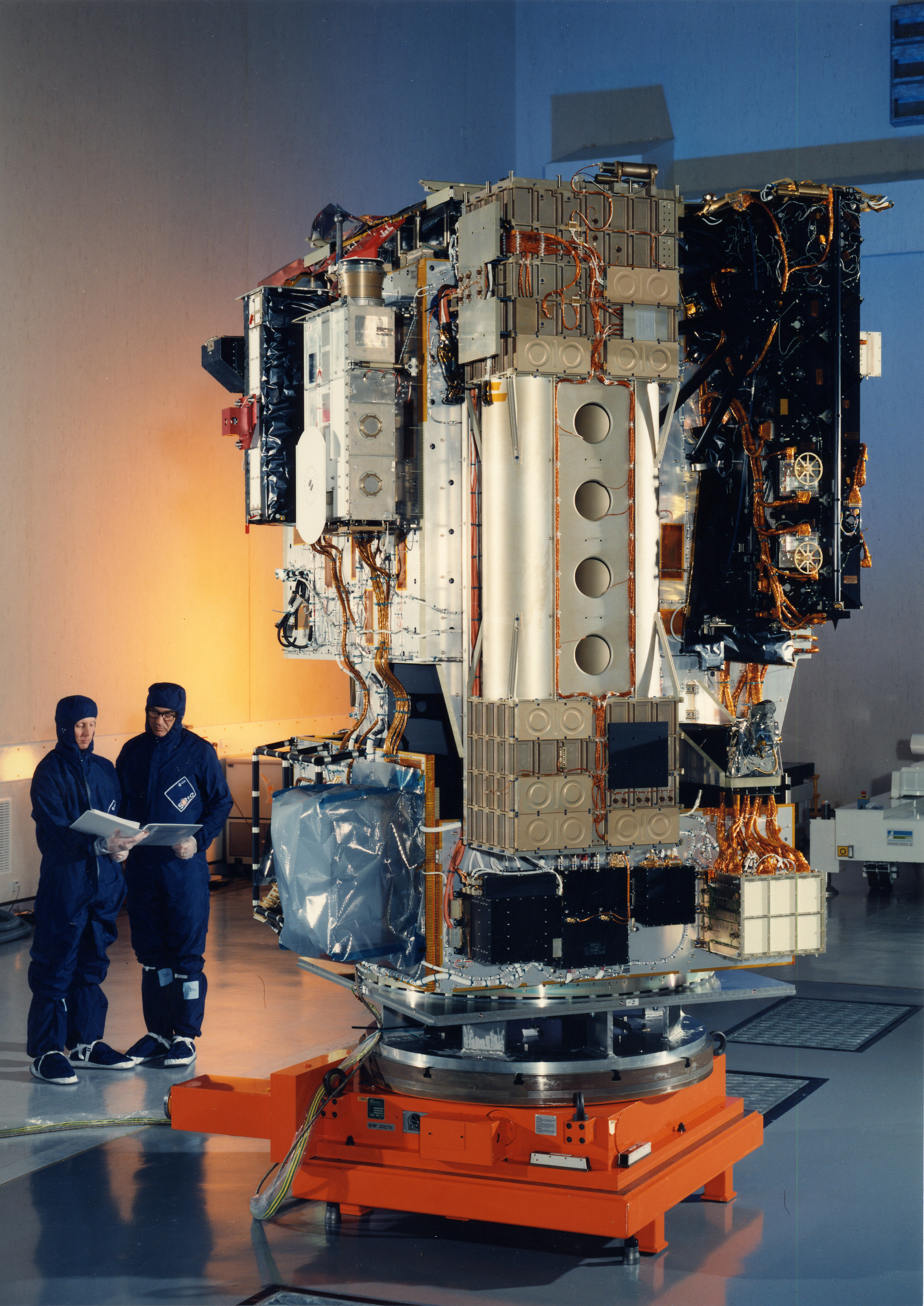
ESA engineers work on the SOHO spacecraft

In normal operation, the spacecraft transmits a continuous 200 kbit/s data stream of photographs and other scientific measurements via the spacecraft's high-gain antenna to the NASA Deep Space Network of 26-meter ground stations. SOHO's data about solar activity are used to predict coronal mass ejection (CME) arrival times at Earth, so electrical grids and satellites can be protected from their damaging effects. CMEs directed toward the earth may produce geomagnetic storms, which in turn produce geomagnetically induced currents, in the most extreme cases creating black-outs, etc.

On June 24, 2003, ESA reported the failure of the antenna Y-axis stepper motor, necessary for pointing the high-gain antenna towards the Earth and allowing the downlink of high-rate data. At the time, it was thought that the antenna anomaly might cause two to three-week data-blackouts of scientific data every three months. However, ESA and NASA engineers managed to use SOHO's pair of low-gain antennas, which were originally only meant for emergencies, together with the larger 34 m (112 ft) and 70 m (230 ft) NASA Deep Space Network ground stations and judicious use of SOHO's Solid State Recorder (SSR) to prevent total data loss, with only a slightly reduced data flow every three months.

== Instruments ==
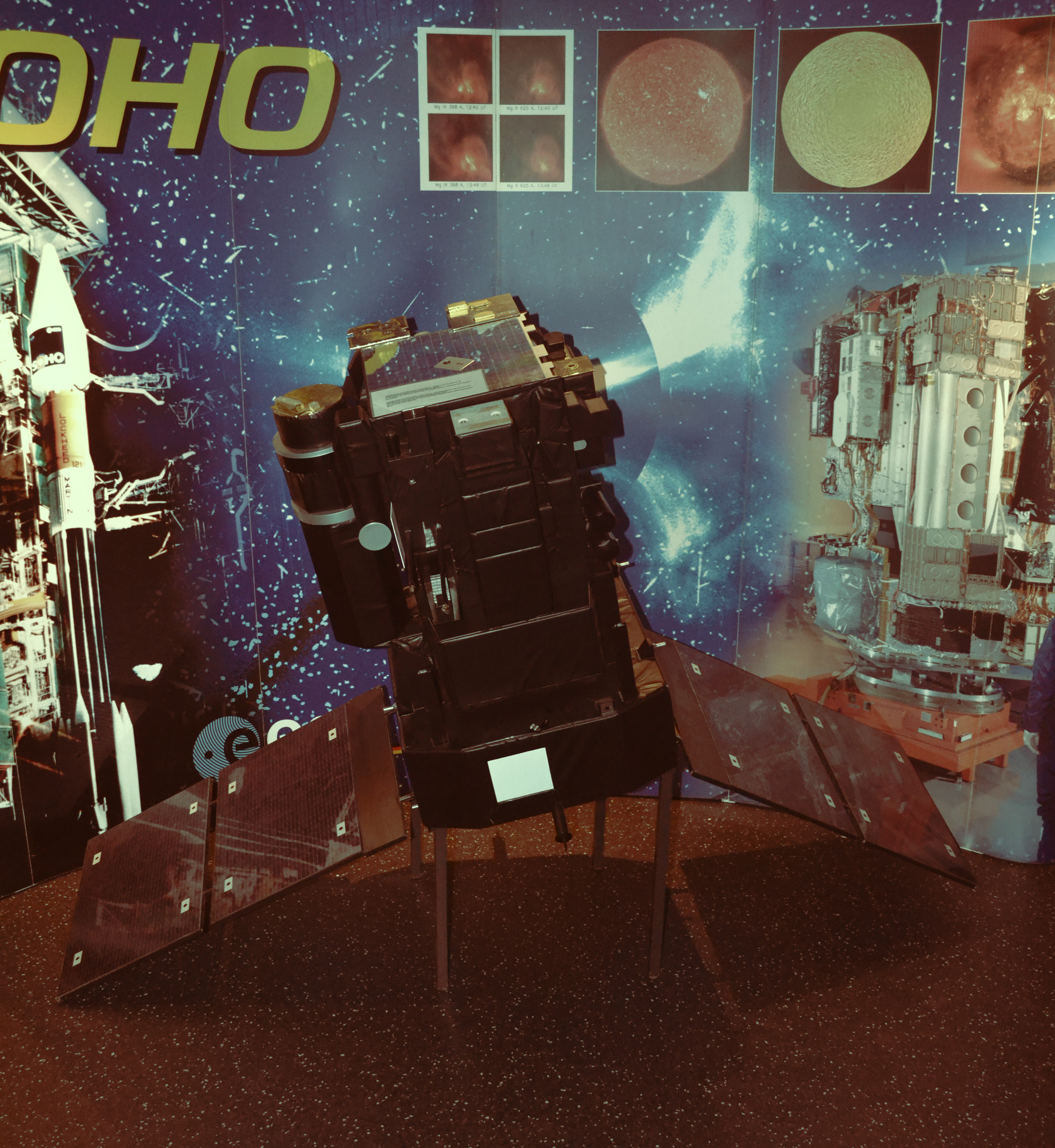
Scale model of SOHO at the Euro Space Center in Belgium

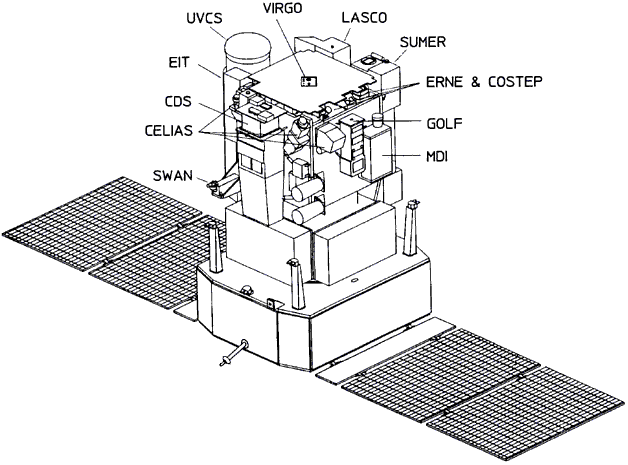
SOHO instruments

The SOHO Payload Module (PLM) consists of twelve instruments, each capable of independent or coordinated observation of the Sun or parts of the Sun, and some spacecraft components. The instruments are:

- Coronal Diagnostic Spectrometer (CDS ), which measures density, temperature and plasma flows in the corona and can provide information on the elemental composition.
- Charge Element and Isotope Analysis System (CELIAS), which studies the ion composition of the solar wind and interplanetary energetic particles.
- Comprehensive SupraThermal and Energetic Particle analyser collaboration (COSTEP ), which studies the ion and electron composition of the solar wind. COSTEP and ERNE are sometimes referred to together as the COSTEP-ERNE Particle Analyzer Collaboration (CEPAC ).
- Extreme ultraviolet Imaging Telescope (EIT), which studies the low coronal structure and activity.
- Energetic and Relativistic Nuclei and Electron experiment (ERNE ), which studies the ion and electron composition of the solar wind. (See note above in COSTEP entry.)
- Global Oscillations at Low Frequencies (GOLF), which measures velocity variations of the whole solar disk to explore the core of the Sun.
- Large Angle and Spectrometric Coronagraph (LASCO), which studies the structure and evolution of the corona by creating an artificial solar eclipse.
- Michelson Doppler Imager (MDI), which measures velocity and magnetic fields in the photosphere to learn about the convection zone which forms the outer layer of the interior of the Sun and about the magnetic fields which control the structure of the corona. The MDI was the biggest producer of data on SOHO. Two of SOHO's virtual channels are named for MDI; VC2 (MDI-M) carries MDI magnetogram data, and VC3 (MDI-H) carries MDI Helioseismology data. MDI has not been used for scientific observation since 2011 when it was superseded by the Solar Dynamics Observatory's Helioseismic and Magnetic Imager.
- Solar Ultraviolet Measurement of Emitted Radiation (SUMER), which measures plasma flows, temperature, and density in the corona.
- Solar Wind Anisotropies (SWAN), which uses telescopes sensitive to a characteristic wavelength of hydrogen to measure the solar wind mass flux, map the density of the heliosphere, and observe the large-scale structure of the solar wind streams.
- UltraViolet Coronagraph Spectrometer (UVCS), which measures density and temperature in the corona.
- Variability of solar IRradiance and Gravity Oscillations (VIRGO), which measures oscillations and solar constant both of the whole solar disk and at low resolution, again exploring the core of the Sun.

=== Instrument contributors ===
The Max Planck Institute for Solar System Research contributed to SUMER, Large Angle and Spectrometric Coronagraph (LASCO), and CELIAS instruments. The Smithsonian Astrophysical Observatory (SAO) built the UVCS instrument. The Lockheed Martin Solar and Astrophysics Laboratory (LMSAL) built the MDI instrument in collaboration with the solar group at Stanford University. The Institut d'astrophysique spatiale is the principal investigator of GOLF and Extreme ultraviolet Imaging Telescope (EIT), with a strong contribution to SUMER. A complete list of all the instruments, with links to their home institutions, is available at the SOHO Website.

== Public availability of images ==
Observations from some of the instruments can be formatted as images, most of which are readily available on the internet for either public or research use (see the official website). Others, such as spectra and measurements of particles in the solar wind, do not lend themselves so readily to this. These images range in wavelength or frequency from optical (Hα) to Extreme ultraviolet (EUV). Images taken partly or exclusively with non-visible wavelengths are shown on the SOHO page and elsewhere in false color.

Unlike many space-based and ground telescopes, there is no time formally allocated by the SOHO program for observing proposals on individual instruments; interested parties can contact the instrument teams via e-mail and the SOHO website to request time via that instrument team's internal processes (some of which are quite informal, provided that the ongoing reference observations are not disturbed). A formal process (the "JOP" program) does exist for using multiple SOHO instruments collaboratively on a single observation. JOP proposals are reviewed at the quarterly Science Working Team (SWT) meetings, and JOP time is allocated at monthly meetings of the Science Planning Working Group. First results were presented in Solar Physics, volumes 170 and 175 (1997), edited by B. Fleck and Z. Švestka.

== Comet discoveries ==
Comet discoveries
Year	#
2015	218
2014	195
2013	213
2012	222
2011	216
2010	209
2009	167
2008	172
2007	168
2006	152
2005	170
2004	173
2003	148
2002	134
2001	112
2000	101
1999	95
1998	79
1997	88
1996	32

As a consequence of its observing the Sun, SOHO (LASCO instrument) has inadvertently allowed the discovery of comets by blocking out the Sun's glare. Approximately one-half of all known comets have been spotted by SOHO, discovered over the last 15 years by over 70 people representing 18 different countries searching through the publicly available SOHO/LASCO images online. SOHO had discovered over 2,700 comets by April 2014, with an average discovery rate of one every 2.59 days.

This visualisation presents a small sample of the 9 years of comets seen by SOHO from the perspective an observer at a fixed point above the ecliptic plane with the Sun at the centre.

=== Milestones ===
- SOHO-1000 (C/2005 P2)– 5 August 2005, Toni Scarmanto
- SOHO-2000 (C/2010 Y20) – 26 December 2010, Michał Kusiak
- SOHO-3000 (C/2015 ??) – 13 September 2015, Worachate Boonplod
- SOHO-4000 (C/2020 ??) – 15 September 2020, Trygve Prestgard
- SOHO-5000 (C/2024 ??) – 25 March 2024, Hanjie Tan

To July 23, 2025, SOHO has found 5,217 comets.

== Near loss of SOHO in 1998 ==
The SOHO Mission Interruption sequence of events began on 24 June 1998, while the SOHO Team was conducting a series of routine spacecraft gyroscope calibrations and manoeuvres. Operations proceeded until 23:16 UTC when SOHO lost lock on the Sun and entered an emergency attitude control mode called Emergency Sun Reacquisition (ESR). This was due to command errors which caused Gyro B, the gyro responsible for fault detection, to remain in its high gain setting which lead it to incorrectly detect a roll rate of 20 times greater than the actual rate, triggering the ESR mode. The spacecraft later entered Initial Sun Acquisition mode (ISA). To correct the detected (but non-existent) roll attitude error the spacecraft fired its roll thrusters. The SOHO Team attempted to recover the observatory, but SOHO entered the emergency mode again on 25 June 1998, at 02:35 UTC, less than 1 minute after the thruster firings as the roll rate returned to a sufficiently high speed to be detected by Gyro B and trigger ESR-6 (The 6th ESR mode since launch). Recovery efforts continued, but SOHO entered the emergency mode for the last time at 04:38 UTC. All contact with SOHO was lost at 04:43:56 UTC, and the mission interruption had begun. SOHO was spinning, losing electrical power, and no longer pointing at the Sun.

Expert ESA personnel were immediately dispatched from Europe to the United States to direct operations. Days passed without contact from SOHO. On 23 July 1998, the Arecibo Observatory and Goldstone Solar System Radar combined to locate SOHO with radar and to determine its location and attitude. SOHO was close to its predicted position, oriented with its side versus the usual front Optical Surface Reflector panel pointing toward the Sun, and was rotating at one revolution every 53 seconds. Once SOHO was located, plans for contacting SOHO were formed. On 3 August, a carrier was detected from SOHO, the first signal since 25 June 1998. After days of charging the battery, a successful attempt was made to modulate the carrier and downlink telemetry on 8 August. After instrument temperatures were downlinked on 9 August 1998, data analysis was performed, and planning for the SOHO recovery began in earnest.

The Recovery Team began by allocating the limited electrical power. After this, SOHO's anomalous orientation in space was determined. Thawing the frozen hydrazine fuel tank using SOHO's thermal control heaters began on 12 August 1998. Thawing pipes and the thrusters was next, and SOHO was re-oriented towards the Sun on 16 September 1998. After nearly a week of spacecraft bus recovery activities and an orbital correction manoeuvre, the SOHO spacecraft bus returned to normal mode on 25 September 1998 at 19:52 UTC. Recovery of the instruments began on 5 October 1998 with SUMER, and ended on 24 October 1998, with CELIAS.

Only one gyroscope remained operational after this recovery, and on 21 December 1998, that gyroscope failed. Attitude control was accomplished with manual thruster firings that consumed 7 kg (15 lb) of fuel weekly, while the ESA developed a new gyroless operations mode that was successfully implemented on 1 February 1999.

== See also ==
- List of European Space Agency programmes and missions
- Space Weather Follow On-Lagrange 1, launched 2025.
- Advanced Composition Explorer, launched 1997, still operational.
- Deep Space Climate Observatory (DSCOVR), launched 2015, orbiting in L_{1}.
- Heliophysics
- High Resolution Coronal Imager (Hi-C), launched 2012, sub-orbital telescope.
- Parker Solar Probe, launched 2018, still operational.
- Phoebus group, international scientists aiming at detecting solar g modes
- SOHO 2333
- Solar Dynamics Observatory (SDO), launched 2010, still operational.
- Solar Orbiter, launched 2020, still operational.
- STEREO (Solar TErrestrial RElations Observatory), launched 2006, still operational.
- Transition Region and Coronal Explorer (TRACE), launched 1998, decommissioned 2010.
- Ulysses (spacecraft), launched 1990, decommissioned 2009.
- Wind (spacecraft), launched 1994, still operational.

== Bibliography ==
- "SOHO's Recovery – An Unprecedented Success Story" (PDF).
- "SOHO Mission Interruption Preliminary Status and Background Report – July 15, 1998".
- "SOHO Mission Interruption Joint NASA/ESA Investigation Board Final Report – August 31, 1998".
- "SOHO Recovery Team". Image
- "The SOHO Mission L_{1} Halo Orbit Recovery From the Attitude Control Anomalies of 1998" (PDF). Archived from the original (PDF) on 19 August 2014.
- Weiss, K. A.; Leveson, N.; Lundqvist, K.; Farid, N.; Stringfellow, M. (2001). "An analysis of causation in aerospace accidents". 20th DASC. 20th Digital Avionics Systems Conference (Cat. No.01CH37219). Vol. 1. pp. 4A3/1–4A3/12. doi:10.1109/DASC.2001.963364. ISBN 978-0-7803-7034-0. S2CID 111244003.
- Leveson, N. G. (July 2004). "The Role of Software in Spacecraft Accidents". Journal of Spacecraft and Rockets. 41 (4): 564–575. Bibcode:2004JSpRo..41..564L. doi:10.2514/1.11950.
- Neumann, Peter G. (January 1999). "Risks to the Public in Computers and Related Systems". ACM SIGSOFT Software Engineering Notes. 24 (1): 31–35. doi:10.1145/308769.308773. S2CID 36328273.
