= Virtual Solar Observatory =

- The VSO logo
- Developer: NASA / VSO Team
- Type: Astrophysics data access system
- Website: virtualsolar.org

The Virtual Solar Observatory (VSO) is a distributed access system for solar physics relevant scientific data.

VSO allows users to query a distributed database to find solar images, spectra, and other data collected by observatories in space and around the globe.

VSO query parameters can include date/time and particular image characteristics such as wavelength, spatial resolution, or the particular observatory that collected the data.

VSO query parameters can include date/time and particular image characteristics such as wavelength, spatial resolution, or the particular observatory that collected the data.

VSO itself is not a data repository nor a database; rather, it is a lightweight interface layer that ties together a uniform query format and re-issues queries to the heterogeneous collection of data repositories associated with solar observatories around the globe. The returned data are regularized to provide access information in a standardized format. From the observatory perspective, VSO affords a convenient way to share data by registering a local data repository with the central system. From the user perspective, VSO simulates a single centralized data-retrieval system that allows users to query the world's solar-physics data repositories as if they were a single system.

VSO has several interfaces. A web query page affords direct access, via tables of URLs, to data products with little up-front development. An http API exists, with client modules distributed in IDL (via Solarsoft) and in Python (via SunPy), so that users can interface VSO queries to data-reduction pipelines or other tools on a procedural basis.

VSO is a community-organized project that receives funding from several sources including NASA and NSF. It is relied upon throughout the heliophysics research community as a convenient and reliable way to access solar data regardless of source observatory.

== See also ==
- List of solar telescopes (ground based)
- List of heliophysics missions – space telescopes used to observe the Sun
- Coronagraph
- Heliostat
- Heliometer
- Helioscope
- Spectroheliograph
- Spectrohelioscope
- Solar astronomy
