= Extreme ultraviolet =

Ultraviolet light with a wavelength of 10–121nm

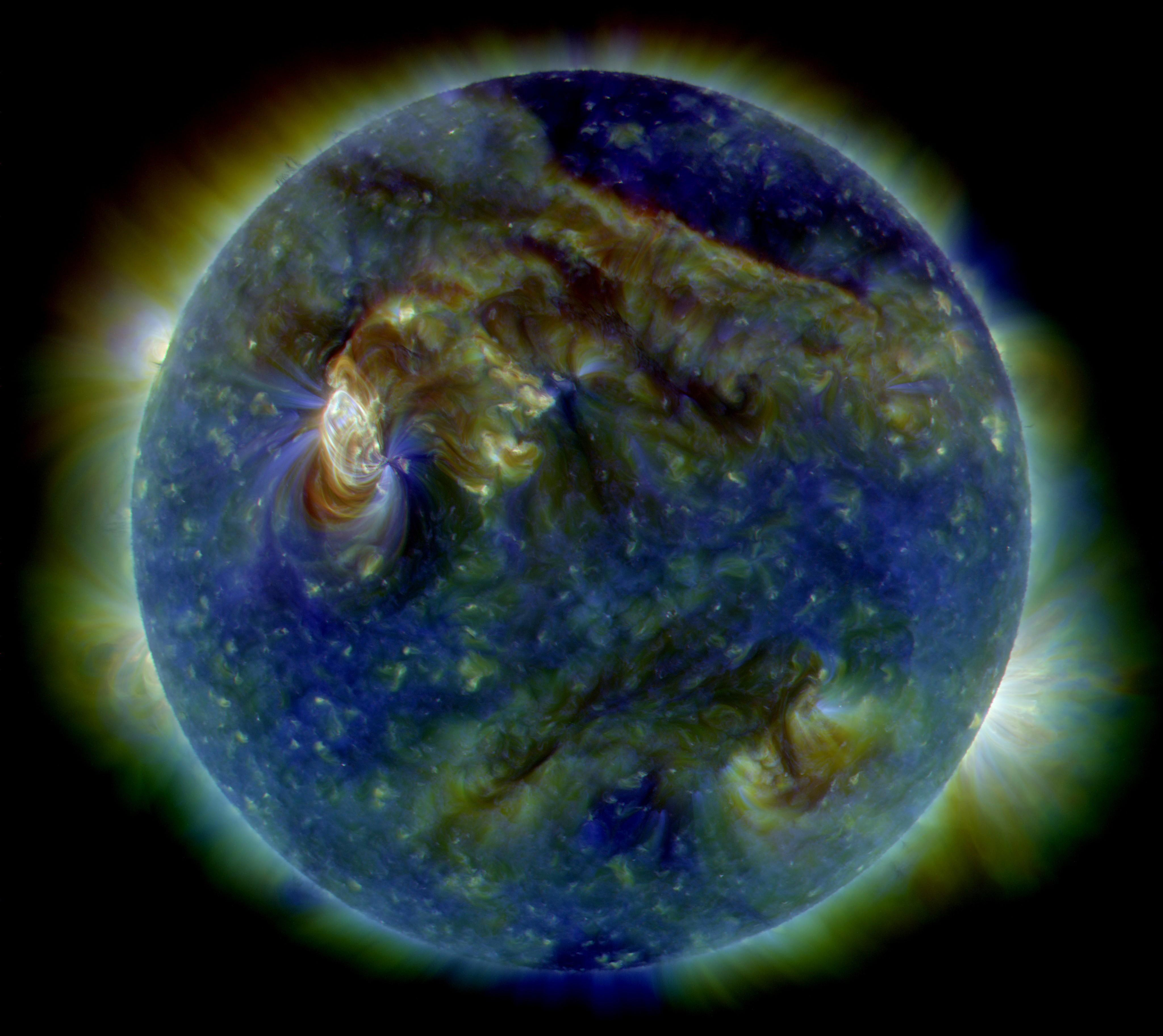
Extreme ultraviolet composite image of the Sun (red: 21.1 nm, green: 19.3 nm, blue: 17.1 nm) taken by the Solar Dynamics Observatory on August 1, 2010

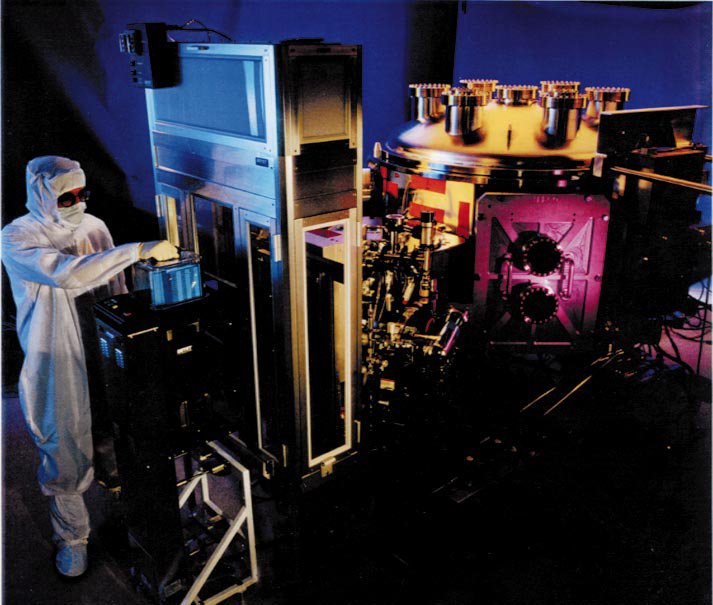
13.5 nm extreme ultraviolet light is used commercially for photolithography as part of the semiconductor fabrication process. This image shows an early, experimental tool.

Extreme ultraviolet radiation (EUV or XUV) or high-energy ultraviolet radiation is electromagnetic radiation in the part of the electromagnetic spectrum spanning wavelengths shorter than the hydrogen Lyman-alpha line from 121 nm down to the X-ray band of 10 nm. By the Planck–Einstein equation the EUV photons have energies from 10.26 eV up to 124.24 eV, where we enter the X-ray energies. EUV is naturally generated by the solar corona and artificially by plasma, high harmonic generation sources and synchrotron light sources. Since the ultraviolet C range extends to 100 nm, there is some overlap in the terms.

The main uses of extreme ultraviolet radiation are photoelectron spectroscopy, solar imaging, and lithography. In air, EUV is the most highly absorbed component of the entire electromagnetic spectrum, requiring high vacuum for transmission.

== EUV generation ==
Neutral atoms or condensed matter do not have large enough energy transitions to emit EUV radiation. Ionization must take place first. EUV light can only be emitted by electrons which are bound to multicharged positive ions; for example, to remove an electron from a +3 charged carbon ion (three electrons already removed) requires about 65 eV. Such electrons are more tightly bound than typical valence electrons. The existence of multicharged positive ions is only possible in a hot dense plasma. Alternatively, the free electrons and ions may be generated temporarily and instantaneously by the intense electric field of a very-high-harmonic laser beam. The electrons accelerate as they return to the parent ion, releasing higher energy photons at diminished intensities, which may be in the EUV range. If the released photons constitute ionizing radiation, they will also ionize the atoms of the harmonic-generating medium, depleting the sources of higher-harmonic generation. The freed electrons escape since the electric field of the EUV light is not intense enough to drive the electrons to higher harmonics, while the parent ions are no longer as easily ionized as the originally neutral atoms. Hence, the processes of EUV generation and absorption (ionization) strongly compete against each other.

In the beginning of the 21st century multiple EUV sources appeared based on the free-electron laser and table top EUV sources based on high harmonic generation techniques. First generation commercial systems for EUV lithography based on laser-produced plasma (LPP) light generation have been shipped.

=== Direct tunable generation of EUV ===
EUV light can also be emitted by free electrons orbiting a synchrotron.

Continuously tunable narrowband EUV light can be generated by four wave mixing in gas cells of krypton and hydrogen to wavelengths as low as 110 nm. In windowless gas chambers fixed four wave mixing has been seen as low as 75 nm.

== EUV absorption in matter ==
When an EUV photon is absorbed, photoelectrons and secondary electrons are generated by ionization, much like what happens when X-rays or electron beams are absorbed by matter.

The response of matter to EUV radiation can be captured in the following equations:

Point of absorption:

EUV photon energy = 92 eV, = Electron binding energy + photoelectron initial kinetic energy

Within 3 mean free paths of photoelectron (1–2 nm):

Reduction of photoelectron kinetic energy = ionization potential + secondary electron kinetic energy;

Within 3 mean free paths of secondary electron (~30 nm):

1. Reduction of secondary electron kinetic energy = ionization potential + tertiary electron kinetic energy
2. Nth generation electron slows down aside from ionization by heating (phonon generation)
3. Final generation electron kinetic energy ~ 0 eV => dissociative electron attachment + heat, where the ionization potential is typically 7–9 eV for organic materials and 4–5 eV for metals.

The photoelectron subsequently causes the emission of secondary electrons through the process of impact ionization. Sometimes, an Auger transition is also possible, resulting in the emission of two electrons with the absorption of a single photon.

Strictly speaking, photoelectrons, Auger electrons and secondary electrons are all accompanied by positively charged holes (ions which can be neutralized by pulling electrons from nearby molecules) in order to preserve charge neutrality. An electron-hole pair is often referred to as an exciton. For highly energetic electrons, the electron-hole separation can be quite large and the binding energy is correspondingly low, but at lower energy, the electron and hole can be closer to each other. The exciton itself diffuses quite a large distance (>10 nm). As the name implies, an exciton is an excited state; only when it disappears as the electron and hole recombine, can stable chemical reaction products form.

Since the photon absorption depth exceeds the electron escape depth, as the released electrons eventually slow down, they dissipate their energy ultimately as heat. EUV wavelengths are absorbed much more strongly than longer wavelengths, since their corresponding photon energies exceed the bandgaps of all materials. Consequently, their heating efficiency is significantly higher, and has been marked by lower thermal ablation thresholds in dielectric materials.

=== Solar minima/maxima ===
Certain wavelengths of EUV vary by as much as a factor of 50 between solar minima and maxima, which may contribute to stratospheric warming and regarding ozone there is less energy needed to form ozone than to destroy it more energy from solar wind is rather damaging ozone layer. These in turn contribute to climate change related phenomena.

== EUV damage ==
Like other forms of ionizing radiation, EUV and electrons released directly or indirectly by the EUV radiation are a likely source of device damage. Damage may result from oxide desorption or trapped charge following ionization. Damage may also occur through indefinite positive charging by the Malter effect. If free electrons cannot return to neutralize the net positive charge, positive ion desorption is the only way to restore neutrality. However, desorption essentially means the surface is degraded during exposure, and furthermore, the desorbed atoms contaminate any exposed optics. EUV damage has already been documented in the CCD radiation aging of the Extreme UV Imaging Telescope (EIT).

Radiation damage is a well-known issue that has been studied in the process of plasma processing damage. A recent study at the University of Wisconsin Synchrotron indicated that wavelengths below 200 nm are capable of measurable surface charging. EUV radiation showed positive charging centimeters beyond the borders of exposure while VUV (vacuum ultraviolet) radiation showed positive charging within the borders of exposure.

Studies using EUV femtosecond pulses at the Free Electron Laser in Hamburg (FLASH) indicated thermal melting-induced damage thresholds below 100 mJ/cm^{2}.

An earlier study showed that electrons produced by the 'soft' ionizing radiation could still penetrate ~100 nm below the surface, resulting in heating.

== See also ==
- Extreme Ultraviolet Explorer
- Extreme Ultraviolet Variability Experiment
- Extreme ultraviolet Imaging Telescope
- High harmonic generation
- CHIPSat
- Extreme ultraviolet lithography
