= List of heliophysics missions =

This is a list of missions supporting heliophysics, including solar observatory missions, solar orbiters, and spacecraft studying the solar wind.

== Past and current missions ==
Spacecraft	Launch date	Operator	Orbit	Outcome	Remarks	Carrier rocket
Explorer 10	25 March 1961	NASA	highly elliptical geocentric	Success	Deorbited 1 June 1968	Thor DM-19 Delta
OSO 1 (OSO A)	7 March 1962	NASA	low Earth	Success	Deorbited 7 October 1981	Thor-Delta
Ariel 1	26 April 1962	SERC/NASA	low Earth	Success	Deorbited 24 May 1976	Thor DM-19 Delta
Orbiting Geophysical Observatory (OGO)	4 September 1964	NASA	various geocentric	Success (mostly)	6 satellites, last deorbited 29 August 2020	Atlas Agena, Thor Agena
OSO 2 (OSO B2)	3 February 1965	NASA	low Earth	Success	Deorbited 8 August 1989	Thor-Delta
OSO 3 (OSO E1)	8 March 1967	NASA	low Earth	Success	Observed solar flares from the Sun, as well as a flare from Scorpius X-1; Deorbited 4 April 1982	Thor-Delta
OSO 4 (OSO D)	18 October 1967	NASA	low Earth	Success	Deorbited 14 June 1982	Thor-Delta
OSO 5 (OSO F)	22 January 1969	NASA	low Earth	Success	Measured diffuse background X-ray radiation from 14-200 keV; Deorbited 2 April 1984	Thor-Delta
OSO 6 (OSO G)	9 August 1969	NASA	low Earth	Success	Observed three instances of hard X-ray coincidences with gamma ray bursts; Deorbited 7 March 1981	Thor-Delta
OSO 7 (OSO H)	29 September 1971	NASA	low Earth	Success	Observed solar flares in the gamma ray spectrum; Collected data allowed for identification of Vela X-1 as a High-mass X-ray binary; Deorbited 8 July 1974	Thor-Delta
Prognoz 1	14 April 1972	USSR	highly elliptical geocentric	Success	Study Solar activity	Soyuz
Prognoz 2	29 June 1972	USSR	highly elliptical geocentric	Success	Study Solar activity	Soyuz
Skylab and the Apollo Telescope Mount	14 May 1973	NASA	low Earth	Success	Deorbited 11 July 1979	Saturn INT-21
Prognoz 3	15 February 1973	USSR	highly elliptical geocentric	Success	Study Solar activity	Soyuz
Explorer 50 (IMP-8)	26 October 1973	NASA	high Earth	Success	Contact lost 7 October 2006	Delta (1913)
Helios	10 December 1974	NASA / DFVLR	heliocentric	Success	2 spacecraft, last contact 10 Feb 1986	Titan IIIE/Star-37
Taiyo (Solar Radiation and Thermospheric Satellite/Shinsei-3)	24 February 1975	ISAS	elliptical geocentric	Success	Solar X-ray, UV radiation, and ionosphere studies; Deorbited 29 June 1980	M-3C
OSO 8 (OSO I)	21 June 1975	NASA	low Earth	Success	Found an iron emission line in the X-ray spectrum of a galaxy cluster; Deorbited 8 July 1986	Thor-Delta
Prognoz 4	22 December 1975	USSR	highly elliptical geocentric	Success	Study Solar radiation and Plasma, and Earth's magnetosphere	Soyuz
Prognoz 6	22 September 1977	USSR	highly elliptical geocentric	Success	Study Solar radiation and Plasma, and Earth's magnetosphere	Soyuz
ISEE-1	22 October 1977	NASA	high Earth	Success	Deorbited 26 September 1987	Thor-Delta 2914
ISEE-2	22 October 1977	NASA	high Earth	Success	Deorbited 26 September 1987	Thor-Delta 2914
Prognoz 7	30 October 1978	USSR	highly elliptical geocentric	Success	Study Solar radiation and Plasma, Earth's magnetosphere, UV, X-ray and Gamma ray astronomy; Carried Czechoslovak, French, Hungarian and Swedish experiments	Soyuz
Voyager 2	20 August 1977	NASA	heliocentric to galactocentric	Operational	Part of Voyager program, the spacecraft left heliosphere	Titan IIIE/ Centaur
Voyager 1	5 September 1977	NASA	heliocentric to galactocentric	Operational	Part of Voyager program, the spacecraft left heliosphere	Titan IIIE Centaur
International Cometary Explorer (ICE/ISEE-3)	12 August 1978	NASA	Earth-Sun L1 halo to heliocentric	Success	Contact lost 16 September 2014	Thor-Delta 2914
Prognoz 8	25 December 1980	USSR	highly elliptical geocentric	Success	Study Solar radiation and Plasma, and Earth's magnetosphere; Carried Czechoslovak, Polish and Swedish experiments	Soyuz
International Cometary Explorer (ICE)	12 August 1978	NASA	Earth-Sun L1 halo to heliocentric	Success	Contact lost 16 September 2014	Delta 2914
Solar Maximum Mission (SMM)	14 February 1980	NASA	low Earth	Success	Deorbited 2 December 1989	Delta 3910
Prognoz 9	1 July 1983	USSR	highly elliptical geocentric	Success	Study Solar and cosmic radiation, Solar Plasma, Earth's magnetosphere and Gamma rays; Carried Czechoslovak and French experiments	Soyuz
Prognoz 10 (Intershock)	26 April 1985	USSR	highly elliptical geocentric	Success	Study Solar wind and Earth's magnetosphere; Intercosmos 23; Carried Czechoslovak experiments	Soyuz
Ulysses	6 October 1990	NASA/ESA	high-inclination heliocentric	Success	Decommissioned 30 June 2009	Space Shuttle Discovery
Yohkoh (Solar-A)	30 August 1991	ISAS / NASA / PPARC	low Earth	Success	Deorbited 12 September 2005	Mu-3S-II
Geotail	24 July 1992	ISAS/NASA	high Earth	Success	Deactivated 28 November 2022.	Delta II 6925
Solar Anomalous and Magnetospheric Particle Explorer (SAMPEX)	3 July 1992	NASA/MPE	low Earth	Success	Deorbited 13 November 2012	Scout G-1
WIND	1 November 1994	NASA	Earth-Sun L1 halo	Operational		Delta II (7925–10)
CORONAS-I	1994	Russia	low Earth	Success	12 instruments	Tsyklone-3
Prognoz 11 (Interball Tail Probe)	2 August 1995	Russia	highly elliptical geocentric	Success	Study Solar wind and Earth's magnetosphere	Molniya
Solar and Heliospheric Observatory (SOHO)	2 December 1995	ESA/NASA	Earth-Sun L1 halo	Operational		Atlas IIAS
Prognoz 12 (Interball Auroral Probe)	29 August 1996	Russia	highly elliptical geocentric	Success	Study aurora	Molniya
Polar	24 February 1996	NASA	highly elliptical geocentric	Success	Decommissioned 28 April 2008	Delta II 7925-10
Cluster	4 June 1996	ESA	highly elliptical geocentric	Failure at launch	4 spacecraft	Ariane 5G
Fast Auroral Snapshot Explorer (FAST)	21 August 1996	NASA	low Earth	Success	Decommissioned 4 May 2009	Pegasus-XL
Advanced Composition Explorer (ACE)	25 August 1997	NASA	Earth-Sun L1 Lissajous	Operational		Delta II 7920-8
Spartan 201 (STS-87)	19 November 1997	NASA	low Earth	Failure during deployment	Landed 5 December 1997	Space Shuttle Columbia
Equator-S	2 December 1997	ISTP/MPE	geosynchronous transfer orbit	Partial success (terminated early)	Contact lost 1 May 1998	Ariane 4 (44P)
Transition Region and Coronal Explorer (TRACE)	1 April 1998	NASA	low Earth (Sun-synchronous)	Success	Decommissioned 21 June 2010	Pegasus-XL
Student Nitric Oxide Explorer (SNOE)	26 February 1998	LASP	low Earth	Success	Deorbited 13 December 2003	Pegasus-XL
Active Cavity Radiometer Irradiance Monitor Satellite (ACRIMSAT)	20 December 1999	NASA	low Earth (Sun-synchronous)	Success	Contact lost 14 December 2013	Taurus 2110
IMAGE	25 March 2000	NASA	high Earth	Success	Contact lost 18 December 2005	Delta II 7326-9.5
Cluster II	16 July 2000	ESA	high Earth	Success	4 Spacecraft, replaced the original Cluster mission that failed on launch.	Soyuz-U/Fregat
Thermosphere, Ionosphere, Mesosphere Energetics and Dynamics (TIMED)	7 December 2001	NASA	low Earth	Operational		Delta II 7920-10
CORONAS-F	31 July 2001	Russia	low Earth	Success	16 instruments, worked until 2005	Tsyklon-3
Reuven Ramaty High Energy Solar Spectroscope Imager (RHESSI)	5 February 2002	NASA	low Earth	Success	Decommissioned 16 August 2018 Deorbited 2023	Pegasus-XL
Solar Radiation and Climate Experiment (SORCE)	25 January 2003	NASA/LASP	low Earth	Success	Decommissioned 25 February 2020	Pegasus-XL
Double Star	29 December 2003	CNSA/ESA	highly elliptical geocentric	Success	2 spacecraft, one was deorbited 14 October 2007 the other remains in orbit	Long March 2C
PAMELA detector (located on Resurs-DK No.1)	15 June 2006	PAMELA group	low Earth	Success	Decommissioned 7 February 2016	Soyuz-U
TWINS A & B (located on USA-184 and USA-200)	28 June 2006	NASA	highly elliptical geocentric (Molniya)	Success	2 hosted payloads, decommissioned 2020	Delta IV-M+(4,2), Atlas V 411
Hinode (Solar-B)	23 September 2006	JAXA / NASA / PPARC	low Earth (Sun-synchronous)	Operational		M-V
Solar Terrestrial Relations Observatory (STEREO)	25 October 2006	NASA	heliocentric	Operational	2 spacecraft, 1 still operational	Delta II 7925
CORONAS-Photon	30 January 2009	Russia	low Earth	Failure	11 instruments, failed after 10 months due to power supply problems	Tsyklon-3
Space Technology 5 (ST5)	22 March 2006	NASA	low Earth (Sun-synchronous)	Success	3 spacecraft, decommissioned 30 June 2006	Pegasus-XL
Aeronomy of Ice in the Mesosphere (AIM)	25 April 2007	NASA	low Earth (Sun-synchronous)	Success		Pegasus-XL
Time History of Events and Macroscale Interactions during Substorms (THEMIS)	17 February 2007	NASA	various	Operational	5 spacecraft	Delta II 7925-10C
Coupled Ion-Neutral Dynamics Investigations (CINDI)	16 April 2008	NASA	low Earth	Success	Deorbited 28 November 2015	Pegasus-XL
IBEX	19 October 2008	NASA	high Earth	Operational		Pegasus-XL/Star-27
Solar Dynamics Observatory (SDO)	11 February 2010	NASA	geosynchronous	Operational		Atlas V 401
Van Allen Probes formerly Radiation Belt Storm Probes (RBSP)	30 August 2012	NASA	highly elliptical geocentric	Success	2 spacecraft, decommissioned 2019	Atlas V 401
Balloon Array for Radiation-belt Relativistic Electron Losses (BARREL)	January 2013	NASA	atmospheric	Success	total of 63 flights, last launched 30 August 2016	high-altitude balloons
Interface Region Imaging Spectrograph (IRIS)	27 June 2013	NASA	low Earth (Sun-synchronous)	Operational		Pegasus-XL
Swarm	22 November 2013	ESA	low Earth	Operational	3 spacecraft	Rokot / Briz-KM
Deep Space Climate Observatory (DSCOVR)	11 February 2015	NASA/NOAA	Earth-Sun L1 Lissajous	Operational		Falcon 9 v1.1
Magnetospheric Multiscale Mission (MMS)	13 March 2015	NASA	highly elliptical geocentric	Operational	4 spacecraft	Atlas V 421
Global-scale Observations of the Limb and Disk (GOLD) (aboard SES-14)	26 January 2018	NASA	geosynchronous	Operational		Ariane 5 ECA
Parker Solar Probe formerly Solar Probe Plus	12 August 2018	NASA	heliocentric	Operational		Delta IV Heavy
Space Environment Testbeds (on DSX)	25 June 2019	AFRL	medium Earth	Success	Decommissioned 31 May 2021	Falcon Heavy
Ionospheric Connection Explorer (ICON)	11 October 2019	SSL/NASA	low Earth	Success	Contact lost November 2022	Pegasus-XL
Solar Orbiter	10 February 2020	ESA/NASA	24°-inclination heliocentric	Operational		Atlas V 411
Sunstorm	17 August 2021	ESA	low Earth	Success	CubeSat	Vega
Aditya-L1	2 September 2023	ISRO	Earth-Sun L1 Halo	Operational		PSLV-XL (C57)
CubeSat Radio Interferometry Experiment (CURIE)	9 July 2024	NASA	low Earth	Operational	2 spacecraft	Ariane 6
PROBA-3	5 December 2024	ESA	Highly elliptical orbit	Success	2 spacecraft	PSLV-XL
PUNCH	11 March 2025	NASA	Sun-synchronous orbit	Operational		Falcon 9
EZIE	14 March 2025	NASA		Operational		Falcon 9
TRACERS	23 June 2025	NASA		Operational		Falcon 9
Interstellar Mapping and Acceleration Probe (IMAP)	24 September 2025	NASA	L1 Lagrange point	Operational		Falcon 9
Carruthers Geocorona Observatory	24 September 2025	NASA	L1 Lagrange point	Operational		Falcon 9
SOLAR-1 (previously SWFO-L1)	24 September 2025	NOAA	L1 Lagrange point	Operational		Falcon 9
SMILE	19 May 2026	ESA/CAS	Highly elliptical orbit	Operational		

== Planned missions ==
Spacecraft	Launch date	Operator	Orbit	Description
SunRISE	Summer 2026	NASA	supersynchronous geosynchronous Earth orbit	6 CubeSats
HENON	2026	ESA	Sun-Earth Lagrange point 2	Space weather mission to demonstrate solar storm forecasting capabilities
MUSE	2027	NASA		
Solar-C	2028	JAXA		
HelioSwarm	2029	NASA		nine spacecraft
Solar Polar Orbit Observatory	2029	CNSA	heliocentric polar orbiter	
Vigil	2031	ESA	Earth-Sun L5 and L1	2 spacecraft

== Proposed missions ==
Spacecraft	Proposed launch date	Operator	Status	Refs
Galileo Solar Space Telescope		INPE	Proposed	
ADAHELI		ESA	Proposed	
Heliophysics Environmental and Radiation Measurement Experiment Suite (HERMES)	2025	NASA		
Cross-scale Investigation of Earth’s Magnetotail and Aurora (CINEMA)	NET 2030	NASA	Study	
Chromospheric Magnetism Explorer (CMEx)		NASA	Study	

== Cancelled missions ==
Spacecraft	Proposed launch date	Operator	Status	Refs
Solar Sentinels	2014	NASA	Not selected	
Solar Cruiser	2025	NASA	Not selected	
Sundiver		Australian Academy of Science	Not selected	

== Graphic ==
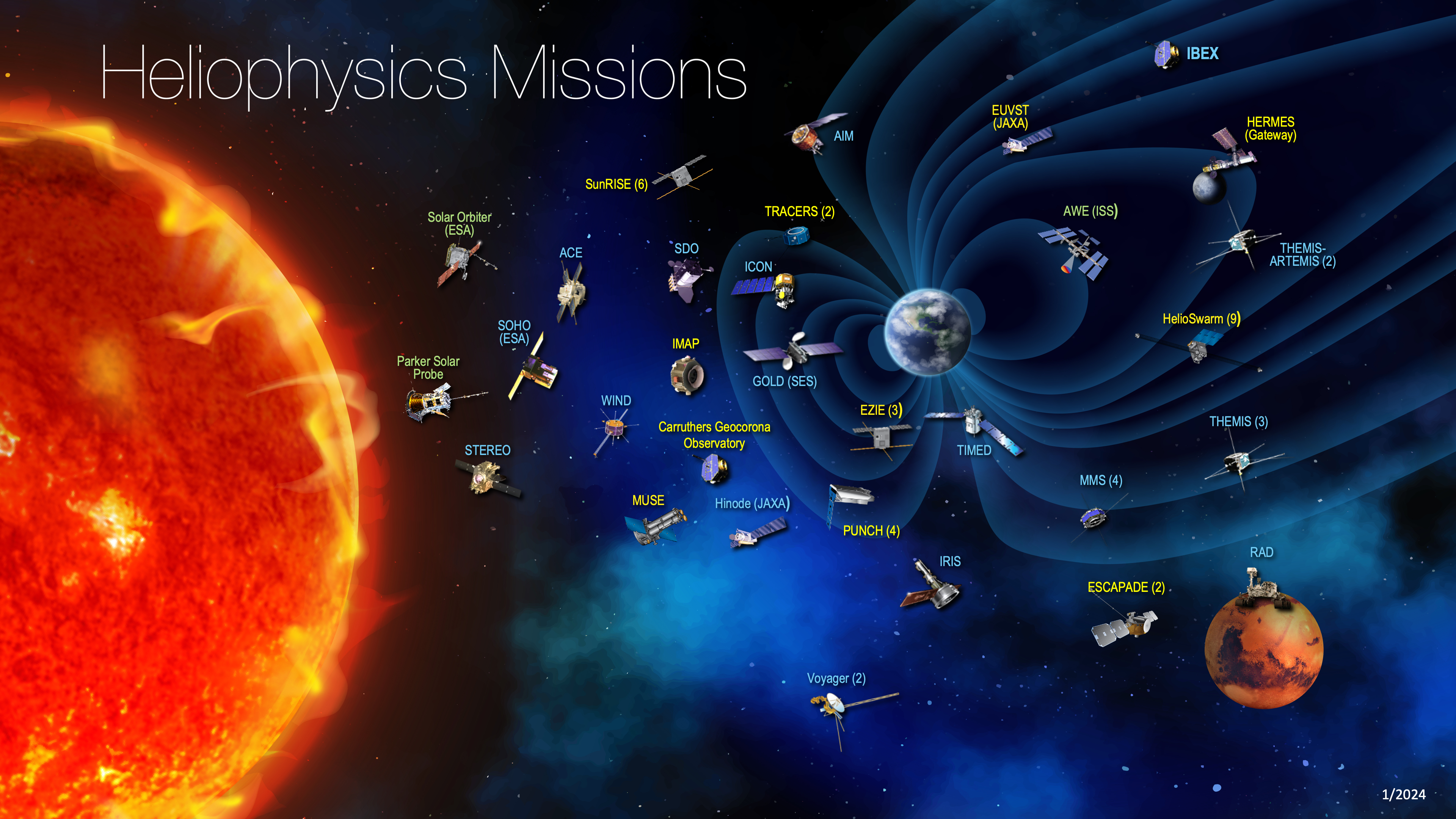
NASA Heliophysics Division fleet as of July 2024

== See also ==
- List of solar telescopes
