= Interball =

International space research project

Interball (Russian: Интербол) is an international space project under the leadership of the Russian Space Agency and the Space Research Institute of the Russian Academy of Sciences. Participants include the Institute of Atmospheric Research of the Czech Academy of Sciences, NASA, European Space Agency, Japan Aerospace Exploration Agency, and the Canadian Space Agency. The project is one of the first multi‑satellite constellations dedicated to studying interactions between the solar wind and Earth’s magnetosphere. The mission's main goal was to research how plasma behaves in important areas like Earth's magnetosphere tail and the boundary between space regions, and the solar wind that moves around it.

== Design ==
The research was conducted by launching two pairs of satellites. Each pair consisted of a large main satellite and a smaller, Czech-built Magion sub-satellite. The first pair was launched August 3, 1995 and was called the Tail Probe (Interball-1 and Magion-4). That pair was placed in a long stretched out orbit that its distance from earth was about 200,000 km. The second pair launched August 29, 1996 and was named the Auroral Probe (Interball-2 and Magion-5). It was placed in a polar orbit over the Northern Hemisphere, at an altitude of about 20,000 km.

Both orbits were nearly parallel to the ecliptic. Each probe consisted of a pair satellite-sub-satellite. Sub-satellites “Magion-4” (auroral) and “Magion-5” (tail) were procured by the Institute of atmospheric Research of the Czech Academy of Sciences. The communication with “Magion-5” was interrupted August 30, 1996 and was restored May 7, 1998. The life expectancy of those vehicles was 12 years.

== Results ==
The mission provided information about how plasma behaves in Earth’s magnetosphere. It measured the magnetic field at the edge of the magnetosphere (called the magnetopause) and observing plasma waves and disturbances, like the Kelvin-Helmholtz instability that happens near the high-latitude boundaries of the magnetopause.

== Related projects ==
- GEOTAIL
- WIND
- POLAR
- SOHO
- FAST
- RELICT-1
- RELICT-2
