= Relikt =

Relikt may refer to:

- RELIKT-1, a Soviet cosmic microwave background anisotropy experiment on board the Prognoz 9 satellite
- Relikt explosive reactive armour for military vehicles, an improved version of Kontakt-5
