= Juichi Yamagiwa =

Japanese anthropologist (born 1952)

- 山極 寿一
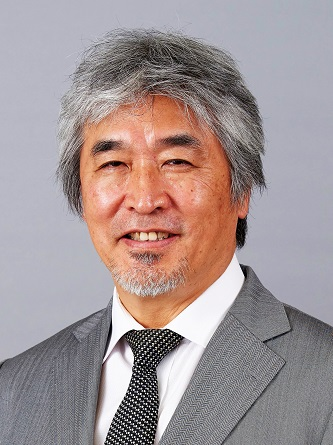

President of Kyoto University, Japan
- In office October 2014 – September 2020
- Preceded by: Hiroshi Matsumoto
- Succeeded by: Nagahiro Minato

Personal details
- Born: 21 February 1952 (age 74) Japan
- Education: Kyoto University, Japan
- Profession: University President
- Scientific career
- Education: Kyoto University
- Fields: Anthropology
- Workplaces: Kyoto University, Japan
- Thesis: (1987)

Juichi Yamagiwa

Japanese name
- Kanji: 山極 寿一
- Hiragana: やまぎわ じゅいち
Transcriptions
- Revised Hepburn: Yamagiwa Juichi
- Traditional Hepburn: Yamagiwa Juichi
- Kunrei-shiki: Yamagiwa Zyuiti
- Nihon-shiki: Yamagiwa Zyuiti

Juichi Yamagiwa (Japanese: 山極 寿一) (born on February 21, 1952) is a Japanese anthropologist and the former president of Kyoto University.

== Early life ==
Yamagiwa received his bachelor's degree in science from Kyoto University in 1971. He then received his master's and Ph.D. degrees in science from the same university in 1977 and 1987 respectively.

== Career ==
Yamagiwa was a research fellow with the Japan Society for the Promotion of Science from 1980 to 1982. In 1982, he joined Kyoto University as a research fellow. From 1983 to 1988, he was a research fellow with the Japan Monkey Center. From 1989 to 1997, he was an assistant professor with the Primate Research Institute of Kyoto University. In 1998, he joined the Graduate School of Science at Kyoto University as an assistant professor and was promoted to professor in 2002. In 2011, he became the Dean of Graduate School of Science. In October 2014, he became President of Kyoto University, retiring from the position in September 2020.

== Professional activities ==
Yamagiwa was president of International Primatological Society from 2008 to 2012 and president of Science Council of Japan from October 2017 to September 2020.
