= Equator-S =

Satellite operational between 1997 and 1998

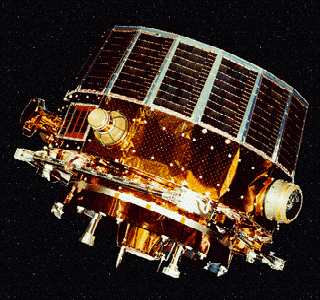
- The Equator-S satellite was operational between 2 December 1997 and 1 May 1998
- Mission type: Heliophysics
- Operator: ISTP
- COSPAR ID: 1997-075B
- SATCAT no.: 25068
- Website: https://www2011.mpe.mpg.de/EQS/eq-s-home.html
- Mission duration: 2 years (planned); 150 days (achieved)

Spacecraft properties
- Manufacturer: Max Planck Institute for Extraterrestrial Physics
- Launch mass: 230 kg (510 lb)

Start of mission
- Launch date: 2 December 1997, 22:52 UTC
- Rocket: Ariane 44P (Flight V103)
- Launch site: Guiana Space Centre ELA-2
- Contractor: Arianespace

End of mission
- Last contact: 1 May 1998

The Equator-S satellite was a spacecraft constructed by the Max Planck Institute for Extraterrestrial Physics for the International Solar-Terrestrial Physics Science Initiative. It was operational between 2 December 1997 and 1 May 1998.

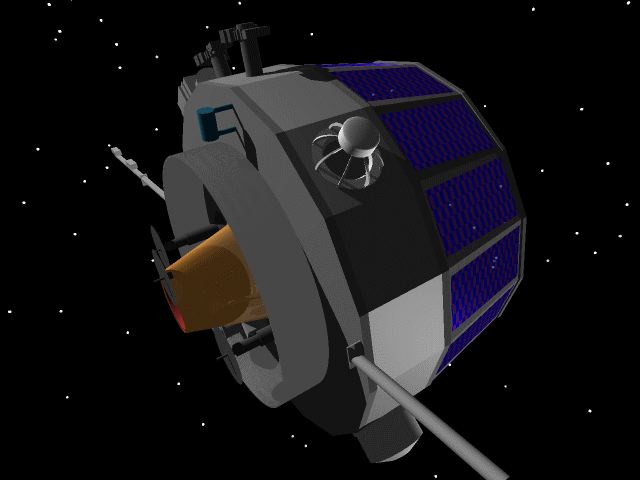
Computer generated image of the Equator-S satellite (NASA).

== Description ==
Equator-S was a low-cost mission, launched with the intention to study the Earth's magnetosphere around the equator at heights lower than 67,000 km. It was located in a near-equatorial orbit, which gave Equator-S the ability to make unique observations about the interaction between the magnetosphere and interplanetary space. Equator-S had a very high spin rate and was launched on an Ariane 4 rocket on 2 December 1997.

The mission ended earlier than expected, having initially been intended to have a lifetime of two years. The mission was terminated on 1 May 1998 after the failure of the onboard processor system.

== See also ==
- List of heliophysics missions
