= Auroral kilometric radiation =

Intense radio radiation from an aurora

Auroral kilometric radiation (AKR) is the intense radio radiation emitted in the acceleration zone (at a height of three times the radius of the Earth) of the polar lights. The radiation mainly comes from cyclotron radiation from electrons orbiting around the magnetic field lines of the Earth. The radiation has a frequency of between 50 and 500 kHz and a total power of between about 1 million and 10 million watts. The radiation is absorbed by the ionosphere and therefore can only be measured by satellites positioned at vast heights, such as the Fast Auroral Snapshot Explorer (FAST). According to the data of the Cluster mission, it is beamed out in the cosmos in a narrow plane tangent to the magnetic field at the source.

As some other planets emit cyclotron radiation too, AKR could be used to learn more about Jupiter, Saturn, Uranus and Neptune, and to detect extrasolar planets.

== Space physics ==
AKR is connected with solar wind - magnetosphere - ionosphere coupling.

=== Substorms ===
AKR emission famously extends to lower frequencies relating to substorm activity.

== History of observations ==
AKR was first observed in the 1960s by Earth orbiting spacecraft.

=== Spacecraft that have observed AKR ===
AKR is observed by (generally Earth orbiting-) spacecraft, although a small portion of the signal is able to be seen from the ground at the poles. Some spacecraft that have observed AKR include:

- Wind
- Cassini
- IMP 6 and 8
- Hawkeye
- GEOTAIL
- POLAR
- IMAGE
- Cluster
