= Jeroboam (disambiguation) =

Jeroboam was the first king of the separate northern kingdom of Israel.

Jeroboam may also refer to:

- Jeroboam II, a later king of Israel
- Jeroboam (unit), a traditional wine bottle unit of measure
  - By extension, a chamber pot
- Trumpet (satellite), a United States spy satellite also known as JEROBOAM
