= Anton Buslov =

Russian blogger and writer (1983–2014)

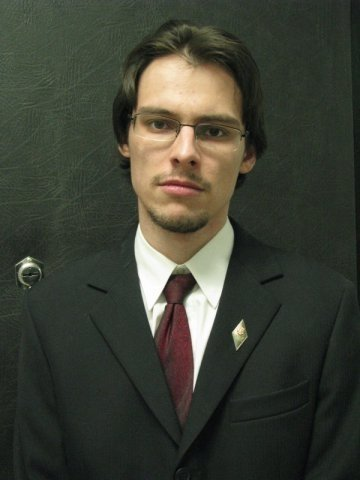
- Buslov in 2009
- Born: Антон Сергеевич Буслов; 4 November 1983; Voronezh, Russian SFSR, Soviet Union
- Died: 20 August 2014 (aged 30); New York City, New York, U.S.
- Occupations: Astrophysicist; blogger; columnist; transportation expert
- Spouses: ? (m. 2005; div. 2009) Mariya Nechaeva (m. 2012)

Anton Sergeevich Buslov (4 November 1983 – 20 August 2014) was an astrophysicist, top Russian blogger, columnist at The New Times magazine, and expert on transportation systems. He is also known as a founder of non-governmental organization "Voronezh Citizens for Trams Committee" and both co-chair and co-founder of inter-regional non-governmental organization "City and Transportation". Anton Buslov was highly involved in social activity and acted as a transport expert for urbanist organization "City 4 People".

== Biography ==
Anton Buslov was born and raised in Voronezh. In February 2003, he successfully passed entry exams to the MEPhI Graduate School of Physics. In February 2006, he obtained Specialist degree with the Department of Experimental Nuclear Physics and Theoretical Physics and Cosmophysics. In May 2006, he entered the Post-Graduate School under the Department of Experimental and Theoretic Physics, and started working on his thesis, "Control System and Data Computing in Solar Research Project 'Koronas-Foton'".

In 2009, Anton Buslov graduated from the Post-Graduate School. He was not able to finish the thesis because of his deteriorating health.

== Scientific work ==
Buslov was one of the developers of the solar research project "Koronas-Foton", he also headed the project's Center of Data Computing, Storing of Information and Information Accumulation. As a co-author, he published several works on space physics.

== Public activities ==
Buslov founded NGO "Voronezh Citizens for Trams Committee", which engaged in saving electric transport in Voronezh from destruction. This NGO has become the basis for the future inter-regional NGO "City and Transportation". In 2004, he created Samaratrans.info web-portal, dedicated to the public transport in Samara. Buslov participated in the development of the official website of the Samara transport operator. Starting from 2011 he consulted the Mayor of Samara as a transportation expert, whose area of expertise was infrastructure planning and particularly, the transport infrastructure. Buslov successfully pushed for abolition of laws restricting photography taking in subway systems of Samara, Kazan, Yekaterinburg and Nizhny Novgorod. Since 2012 he has been actively cooperating with "City 4 People" as an expert on transport and urban planning. At the exhibition of "City 4 People" he delivered a series of lectures on transportation. In 2013, Buslov participated in the project of reconstruction of Lenin Avenue and construction of the North-Western Chord together with Vukan R. Vuchic, professor at the University of Pennsylvania. Anton Buslov is one of the authors of the tender documents for the updated map of Moscow metro. He consulted on transportation issues for numerous state, municipal, public and commercial projects.

== Journalistic career ==
Buslov was a regular columnist in The New Times magazine, where he transcribed the history of his struggle with cancer. In 2004, Buslov started a blog in LJ under the name mymaster, in which he touched upon social issues, offered solutions to commuting and political problems, described his travels to various cities all over the world and shared his observations about their structures and transportation systems. His particular interest laid with the trams, the history of their creation and advanced technologies for development of new models. Additionally, the blog provided an extensive coverage of cancer treatment and problems faced by people with cancer. Certain specialized articles from the blog have been republished at times in print media.

== Cancer ==
In January 2011, Anton Buslov was diagnosed with Hodgkin's lymphoma. He was first treated at the Cancer Research Center (Moscow) and the Samara Regional Clinical Oncology Center. Having exhausted the possibilities of treatment in Russia, Buslov sought for an opportunity to continue treatment at the NewYork–Presbyterian Hospital, and started fundraising on the Internet through the readers of his blog. Over 30,000 people donated and the required amount was collected within a week, which became the fastest fundraising for an individual in Runet. Due to certain complications in the treatment, Buslov had to request his "30,000 friends" for additional funds for the treatment, which have also been successfully collected. Buslov was able to go through treatment and rehabilitation in the NewYork–Presbyterian Hospital, providing moral and informational support to cancer patients in the process. He died on 20 August 2014 in New York City.

== Family ==
Buslov's father was an engineer, and his mother was a housewife. He had two siblings: a brother, Dmitri, and a sister, Anastasia. Anton Buslov married for the first time in 2005, but divorced in 2009. His second marriage was in 2012: "When I proposed to my girlfriend, it was not after I was diagnosed with cancer, but right after the doctors told me that I have only a year or half a year left".
