= Prognoz =

Prognoz may refer to:

- Prognoz (satellite), a Soviet space science programme
- US-KMO, a series of early warning satellites sometimes mistakenly called Prognoz
- Prognoz (band), a Baltimore art punk band
