= Hiroshi Matsumoto =

Hiroshi Matsumoto may refer to:

== People ==
- Hiroshi Matsumoto (game designer), or "Finish" Hiroshi, Japanese video game designer
- Dai Matsumoto (born 1959), also credited Hiroshi Matsumoto, Japanese voice actor
- Roy Hitoshi Matsumoto (1913–2014), American Nisei translator during World War II
- Hiroshi Matsumoto (engineer) (1942–2025), Japanese engineer and atmospheric scientist
- Hiroshi Matsumoto, Professor of Legal Medicine, one of established forensic pathologists all over the world

== Arts & entertainment ==
- Hiroshi Matsumoto (Kurt Vonnegut character), a character from the novel Hocus Pocus'

== See also ==
- Hitoshi Matsumoto
