= AKR =

AKR may refer to:

- Akron Fulton International Airport, Ohio, US, FAA LID
- Auroral kilometric radiation
- Araki, a Malayso Polynesian language with the ISO 639-3 code akr
- New Kosovo Alliance (Aleanca Kosova e Re), a political party
- AKR Corporindo, an oil company in Indonesia
- A US Navy hull classification symbol: Vehicle cargo ship (AKR)
- Aldo-keto reductase, a family of enzymes
