= Trumpet (satellite) =

Series of reconnaissance satellites

TRUMPET (also known as JEROBOAM and called Advanced Jumpseat by some observers) is reportedly a series of ELINT reconnaissance satellites launched by the United States during the 1990s to replace the Jumpseat satellites. Speculated to weigh 5,200 kg, three of these satellites were launched into highly elliptical (Molniya) orbits by Titan 4 launch vehicles from Cape Canaveral between 1994 and 1997. Their precise mission and capabilities are classified. News reports state that the satellites monitor radio communication using antennas with diameters of 150 m. It is speculated that the satellites are manufactured by Boeing.

== Design ==
According to NASA's National Space Science Data Center, Trumpet SIGINT satellites have a large deployable mesh antenna, and were initially aimed at monitoring Soviet communications and missile tests. Trumpet 5 is allegedly the second satellite of a new series. Its tasks are believed to be signals intelligence and early warning, using a SBIRS HEO-2 infrared missile early warning package. In addition it is supposed to carry a NASA/Los Alamos TWINS-B magnetospheric research payload.

== Launches ==
Name	COSPAR ID	Launch date	Launch vehicle	Launch site	Launch designation	Orbit	Remarks
First generation
USA-103	1994-026A	3 May 1994	Titan IV (401)A	CCAFS SLC-41	N/A		
USA-112	1995-034A	10 July 1995	Titan IV (401)A	CCAFS SLC-41	N/A		
USA-136	1997-068A	8 November 1997	Titan IV (401)A	CCAFS SLC-41	NROL-4		
Second generation
USA-184	2006-027A	28 June 2006	Delta IV M+(4,2)	VAFB SLC-6	NROL-22		Carries TWINS-A and SBIRS HEO-1 payloads
USA-200	2008-010A	13 March 2008	Atlas V 411	VAFB SLC-3E	NROL-28	1,112 km x 35,780 km x 63.6°	Carries TWINS-B and SBIRS HEO-2 payloads
Third generation
USA-259	2014-081A	13 December 2014	Atlas V 541	VAFB SLC-3E	NROL-35	TBD	Carries SBIRS HEO-3 payload
USA-278	2017-056A	24 September 2017	Atlas V 541	VAFB SLC-3E	NROL-42	TBD	Will probably carry another SBIRS payload

== Cost ==
In 1994, the cost of Trumpet 1 (excluding launch vehicle) were estimated to more than US$1.5 billion (inflation adjusted more than US$ 3.2 billion in 2024).

== See also ==
- Jonathan's Space Report
