= Sunstorm (spacecraft) =

European technology demonstration CubeSat space mission

- Names: SUNSTORM 1 XFM Cube; XFM CubeSat
- Mission type: Space weather, Heliophysics, Technology demonstration
- Operator: European Space Agency
- COSPAR ID: 2021-073C
- SATCAT no.: 49068

Spacecraft properties
- Spacecraft type: 2U CubeSat
- Manufacturer: (Finland) Kuva Space

Start of mission
- Launch date: 17 August 2021
- Rocket: Vega

End of mission
- Disposal: Deorbited
- Declared: 4 September 2024
- Decay date: 5 September 2024

Sunstorm was a heliophysics and space weather monitoring technology demonstration CubeSat satellite by the European Space Agency. During its three-year mission in the low Earth orbit, Sunstorm successfully tested a miniaturised X-Ray Flux Monitor instrument by observing solar flares. It was launched in 2021 on a Vega rocket and reentered the atmosphere in 2024.

== See also ==
- List of European Space Agency programmes and missions
- List of heliophysics missions
