= Prognoz programme =

Series of Soviet scientific research satellites

Prognoz
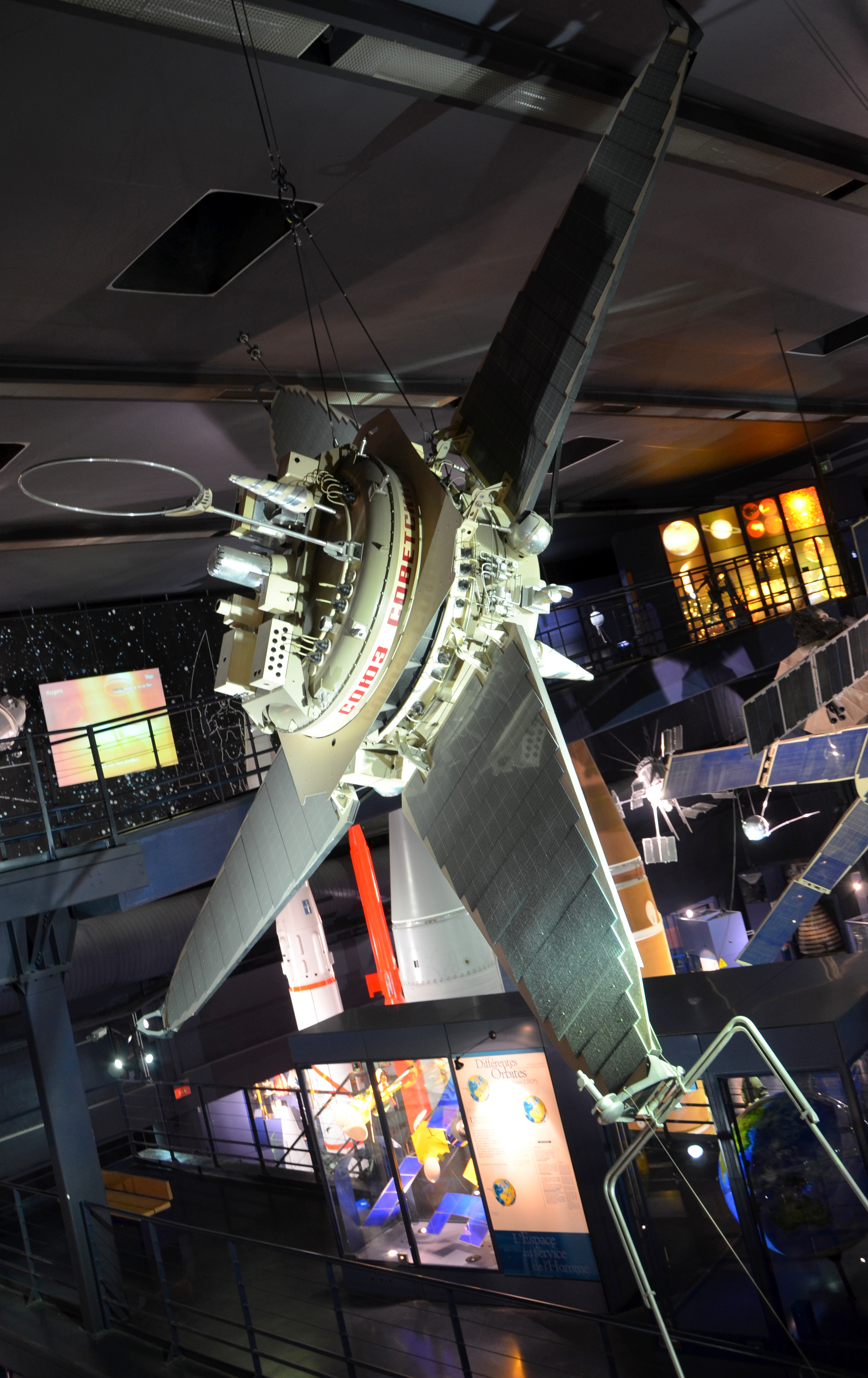
- Manufacturer: Lavochkin
- Country of origin: Soviet Union
- Operator: RVSN
- Applications: Scientific research

Specifications
- Launch mass: 920 kilograms (2,030 lb)
- Regime: HEO

Production
- Status: Retired
- Launched: 12
- Retired: 12
- Maiden launch: Prognoz 1; 14 April 1972
- Last launch: Prognoz 12; 29 August 1996

Prognoz ("Forecast"), also known as SO ("Solar Object," first three satellites), SO-M (SO-modified, next seven satellites), and SO-M2 (last two satellites, also known as Interball), was a Soviet scientific research satellite programme.

== History ==
Twelve Prognoz satellites were launched between 14 April 1972 and 29 August 1996, all by Molniya-M carrier rockets. The satellites were placed in high Earth orbits. The first ten Prognoz satellites were launched from Site 31/6 at the Baikonur Cosmodrome, and the last two from Site 43/3 at the Plesetsk Cosmodrome.

The satellites were designed for Solar research; however, the later satellites were used for other areas, including research into the Big Bang theory and Earth's magnetosphere. The tenth satellite was part of the Interkosmos programme.

== Satellites ==
Designation	Launch date/time (GMT)	Mass	Apogee initial	Perigee initial	Inclination initial	Mission	Remarks
Prognoz 1	14 April 1972, 00:54	845 kilograms (1,863 lb)	199,667 kilometres (124,067 mi)	1,005 kilometres (624 mi)	65°	Study Solar activity	
Prognoz 2	29 June 1972, 03:47	845 kilograms (1,863 lb)	201,804 kilometres (125,395 mi)	517 kilometres (321 mi)	65.3°	Study Solar activity	
Prognoz 3	15 February 1973, 01:11	845 kilograms (1,863 lb)	200,000 kilometres (120,000 mi)	590 kilometres (370 mi)	65°	Study Solar activity	
Prognoz 4	22 December 1975, 02:08	905 kilograms (1,995 lb)	199,000 kilometres (124,000 mi)	634 kilometres (394 mi)	65°	Study Solar radiation and Plasma, and Earth's magnetosphere	
Prognoz 5	25 November 1976, 03:59	930 kilograms (2,050 lb)	198,560 kilometres (123,380 mi)	777 kilometres (483 mi)	65.2°	Study Solar radiation and Plasma, and Earth's magnetosphere	
Prognoz 6	22 September 1977, 00:51	910 kilograms (2,010 lb)	197,867 kilometres (122,949 mi)	488 kilometres (303 mi)	65°	Study Solar radiation and Plasma, and Earth's magnetosphere	
Prognoz 7	30 October 1978, 05:23	950 kilograms (2,090 lb)	202,627 kilometres (125,907 mi)	472 kilometres (293 mi)	64.9°	Study Solar radiation and Plasma, and Earth's magnetosphere UV, X-ray and Gamma ray astronomy	Carried Czechoslovak, French, Hungarian and Swedish experiments
Prognoz 8	25 December 1980, 04:02	910 kilograms (2,010 lb)	197,364 kilometres (122,636 mi)	978 kilometres (608 mi)	65.8°	Study Solar radiation and Plasma, and Earth's magnetosphere	Carried Czechoslovak, Polish and Swedish experiments
Prognoz 9	1 July 1983, 12:17	1,060 kilograms (2,340 lb)	700,000 kilometres (430,000 mi)	480 kilometres (300 mi)	65°	Study Solar and cosmic radiation, Solar Plasma, Earth's magnetosphere and Gamma rays	Carried Czechoslovak and French experiments
Prognoz 10 (Intershock)	26 April 1985, 05:48	1,000 kilograms (2,200 lb)	194,734 kilometres (121,002 mi)	5,975 kilometres (3,713 mi)	65°	Study Solar wind and Earth's magnetosphere	Intercosmos 23. Carried Czechoslovak experiments
Prognoz 11 (Interball Tail Probe)	2 August 1995		193,064 kilometres (119,964 mi)	505 kilometres (314 mi)	63.8°	Study Solar wind and Earth's magnetosphere	
Prognoz 12 (Interball Auroral Probe)	29 August 1996		19,140 kilometres (11,890 mi)	782 kilometres (486 mi)	62.8°	Study aurora	

== See also ==
- Interkosmos
