= Sundiver (space mission) =

Proposed mission to the Sun

Sundiver was a proposed space mission to crash a probe into the Sun, while sending back data to Earth before burning up. It was proposed as a design study by the Australian Academy of Science's National Committee for Space Science as a Flagship mission to kick-start an Australian space program. The design study was proposed as a five-year study from 2011-2015 with a complement of 10 PhDs, budgeted at a cost of $10 M (Australian), leading to a Go/NoGo Decision in 2015.

The mission would have been comparable, in its close approach to the Sun, to the NASA Parker Solar Probe mission, although it would have only made a single pass into the solar corona.
