= USA-184 =

American signals intelligence satellite

- Mission type: ELINT
- Operator: National Reconnaissance Office
- COSPAR ID: 2006-027A
- SATCAT no.: 29249

Start of mission
- Launch date: 28 June 2006, 03:33 UTC
- Rocket: Delta IV-M+(4,2) D317
- Launch site: Vandenberg, SLC-6

Orbital parameters
- Reference system: Geocentric
- Regime: Molniya
- Perigee altitude: 1,138 kilometres (707 mi)
- Apogee altitude: 39,210 kilometres (24,360 mi)
- Inclination: 63.2°

USA-184, also known as NRO Launch 22 or NROL-22, is an American signals intelligence satellite, operated by the National Reconnaissance Office. Launched in 2006, it has been identified as the first in a new series of satellites which are replacing the earlier Trumpet spacecraft.

== Satellite ==
USA-184 was launched by Boeing, using a Delta IV carrier rocket flying in the Medium+(4,2) configuration. The rocket was the first Delta IV to launch from Vandenberg Air Force Base, flying from Space Launch Complex 6, a launch pad originally constructed as part of abandoned plans for crewed launches from Vandenberg, originally using Titan rockets, and later Space Shuttles. The launch also marked the first launch of an Evolved Expendable Launch Vehicle from Vandenberg, and the first launch of an NRO payload on an EELV.

Liftoff took place at 03:33 UTC on 28 June 2006 (20:33 PDT on 27 June). The mission was identified as NRO Launch 22, and was the sixth flight of a Delta IV, with the flight number Delta 317, or D317.

The satellite's orbit and mission are officially classified, however like most classified spacecraft it has been located and tracked by amateur observers. It is in a Molniya orbit with a perigee of 1,138 kilometres (707 mi), an apogee of 39,210 kilometres (24,360 mi), and 63.2° of inclination. In addition to its SIGINT payload, USA-184 also carries two secondary instruments; the SBIRS-HEO-1 missile detection payload as part of the Space-Based Infrared System programme, and NASA's TWINS-1 or TWINS-A magnetospheric science instrument as part of the TWINS programme.
