= Fast Auroral SnapshoT Explorer =

NASA satellite of the Explorer program

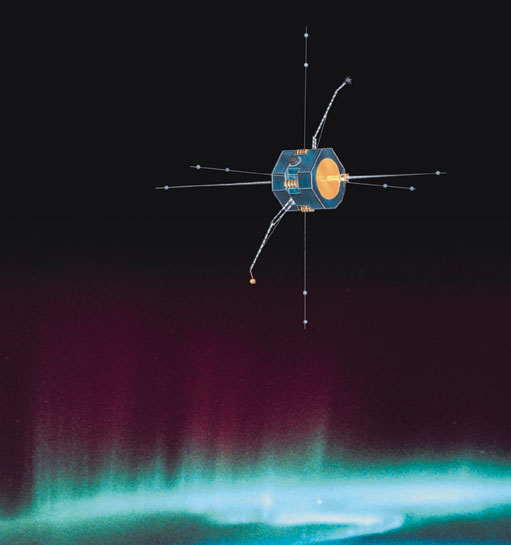
- Fast Auroral SnapshoT Explorer satellite
- Names: Explorer-70; FAST; SMEX-2
- Mission type: Auroral plasma physics
- Operator: NASA / Goddard; Space Sciences Laboratory
- COSPAR ID: 1996-049A
- SATCAT no.: 24285
- Website: http://sprg.ssl.berkeley.edu/fast/
- Mission duration: 3 years (planned); 12 years, 8 months (achieved)

Spacecraft properties
- Spacecraft: Explorer LXX
- Spacecraft type: Fast Auroral SnapshoT Explorer
- Bus: FAST
- Manufacturer: Goddard Space Flight Center
- Launch mass: 187 kg (412 lb)
- Payload mass: 65.3 kg (144 lb)
- Dimensions: 1.02 × 0.93 m (3 ft 4 in × 3 ft 1 in)
- Power: 60 watts

Start of mission
- Launch date: 21 August 1996, 09:47:26 UTC
- Rocket: Pegasus XL (F13)
- Launch site: Vandenberg Air Force Base, Stargazer
- Contractor: Orbital Sciences Corporation
- Entered service: 21 August 1996

End of mission
- Deactivated: 4 May 2009
- Last contact: 4 May 2009

Orbital parameters
- Reference system: Geocentric orbit
- Regime: Low Earth orbit
- Perigee altitude: 346.8 km (215.5 mi)
- Apogee altitude: 3,497.8 km (2,173.4 mi)
- Inclination: 82.97°
- Period: 125.43 minutes

Instruments
- Electric Field and Langmuir Probe Experiment; Electro-Static Analyzers (ESA); Time-of-Flight Energy Angle Mass Spectrograph (TEAMS); Tri-Axial Fluxgate and Search-coil Magnetometers
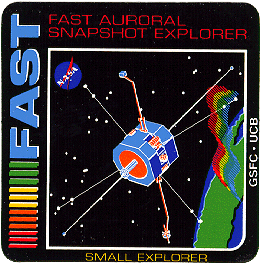
- Fast mission patch SMEX program Explorer program

The Fast Auroral SnapshoT Explorer (FAST or Explorer 70) was a NASA plasma physics satellite, and was the second spacecraft in the Small Explorer program (SMEX). It was launched on 21 August 1996, from Vandenberg Air Force Base aboard a Pegasus XL launch vehicle. The spacecraft was designed and built by NASA's Goddard Space Flight Center (GSFC). Flight operations were handled by GSFC for the first three years, and thereafter were transferred to the University of California, Berkeley's Space Sciences Laboratory.

== Mission ==
FAST was designed to observe and measure the plasma physics of the auroral phenomena which occur around both of Earth's poles. While its Electric Field Experiment failed around 2002, all other instruments continued to operate normally until science operations were ended on 4 May 2009. Various engineering tests were conducted afterward.

FAST investigates the plasma physics of auroral phenomena at extremely high time and spatial resolution using the full complement of particle and field instruments. FAST is the second spacecraft (SAMPEX was first) in the Small Explorer (SMEX) program at NASA-GSFC. SMEX was established to provide rapid (3-year development) low-cost (US$35M development) mission opportunities (1 per year) to the space science community using a single designated principal investigator (PI).

In order to capture the auroral phenomena over small time (microseconds) and spatial scales, FAST utilizes high-speed data sampling, a large, fast-loading ("burst") memory, and a smart, on-board software to trigger on the appearance of various key phenomena. Using a 1 Gb solid-state memory and a data acquisition rate of 8 Mbs (almost two orders of magnitude faster than previous satellites), FAST produces high-resolution "snapshots" of auroral arcs and other interesting auroral events. FAST flies in a highly eccentric, near-polar orbit precessing nominally 1° per day. Scientific investigations are operate in a campaign mode (about 60 days long) as apogee transitions through the northern auroral zone and in less intense survey mode during the rest of the orbit.

== Spacecraft ==
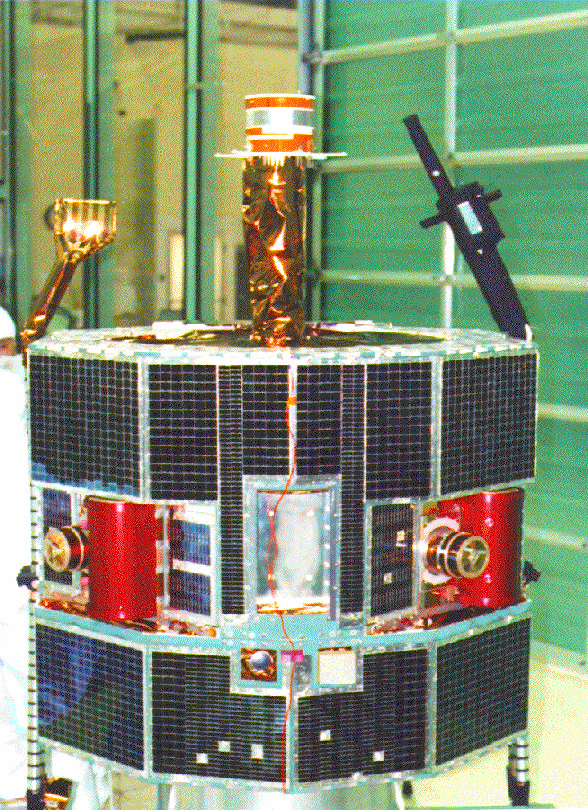
FAST satellite

The FAST mission uses a unique (not a SAMPEX derivative), lightweight, orbit-normal spinner spacecraft developed by the SMEX project. The spacecraft has body-mounted solar arrays and is spin-stabilized, rotating at 12 rpm with the spin axis normal to the orbit plane ("cartwheel"). The four FAST experiments are: (1) the Electrostatic Analyzers (ESA) for measuring the electron and ion distribution function, (2) the Time-of-flight Energy Angle Mass Spectrograph (TEAMS) for measuring the full 3-dimensional distribution function of the major ion species, (3) the Tri-Axial Fluxgate and Search-coil Magnetometers for measuring magnetic field data, and (4) the Electric Field/Langmuir Probe Instrument for obtaining electric field data and plasma density and temperature. The FAST electric field instrument stopped providing meaningful data around 2002, all other instruments and systems continue to function nominally.

== Experiments ==
=== Electric Field and Langmuir Probe Experiment ===
The FAST electric field instrument has ten sensors, two on each of the four 29 m radial wire booms (at 24 m and 29 m) and one on each of the two rigid 3 m axial booms. All except the four outermost sensors can also operate as current collecting Langmuir probes. Similar instruments were flown on S3-3, ISEE-1, CRRES, Polar and Cluster. The instrument is designed to provide the following: a vector measurement of the electric field from DC to about 20 kHz over a dynamic range of 0.1 mV/m to 1 V/m with a sampling resolution of 0.03 ms; AC electric field waveform measurements up to 2 MHz with a sampling resolution of 32 ms; continuous monitoring of the dominant frequency and amplitude of high-frequency waves with a time resolution of 0.03 ms; measurement of the thermal plasma density (1-10^5 cm-3) and temperature with up to 0.5 ms and 1 s time resolution, respectively; measurement of the density fluctuations over a dynamic range of 0.1-20 % with a time resolution of at least 1 ms; measurements of time delays between different antennae with time resolution down to 0.03 ms; and wavelength measurements for frequencies up to 20 kHz using on-board interferometric techniques and multiple sensor separations. The FAST electric field instrument stopped providing meaningful data around 2002.

=== Electro-Static Analyzers (ESA) ===
Sixteen electrostatic analyzers (ESAs) configured in four stacks are used for both electron and ion measurements. The four stacks are placed around the spacecraft such that the entire package is provided a full 360° field of view (FoV). The ESAs can provide a 64-step energy sweep, covering approximately 3 eV to 30 KeV up to 16 times per second. Each ESA stack contains three Stepped ESA (SESA) analyzers that are used to make the high-time resolution electron measurements and a single ion or electron spectrometer (IESA or EESA) used to make detailed distribution measurements. The EESA and IESA step through their energy range, collecting 24, 48, or 96 energy samples in 32 pitch angle sectors. The standard mode (24 samples) measures a pitch angle distribution every 78 ms. The other modes allow alternate trade-offs between time and energy resolution. Depending on their operating mode the SESA sensors measure a distribution containing 16 pitch angle bins and 6, 12, 24, or 48 energy bins. The minimum sample time for an array of 6 energies is 1.6 ms. Angular resolution is 11.2° for the EESA/IESA and 22.5° for the SESA.

=== Time of Flight Energy Angle Mass Spectrograph (TEAMS) ===
The Time-of-flight Energy Angle Mass Spectrograph (TEAMS) instrument is a high-sensitivity mass-resolving spectrometer with an instantaneous 360*8° field of view. It is designed to measure the full three-dimensional distribution function of the major ion species (H+, He++, He+, O+, O2+ plus NO+). The sensor is very similar to the CODIF sensor for the CLUSTER mission and goes back to instruments flown on AMPTE-IRM (SULEICA, 3D-Plasma Instrument). TEAMS selects the incoming ions according to energy per charge (1.2 eV/e to 12 keV/e) by electrostatic deflection in a toroidal section analyzer with subsequent acceleration (up to 25 keV/e) and time of flight (ToF) analysis. For each individual ion the instruments measures the energy per charge (electrostatic analyzer) the mass per charge (ToF analyzer), the incidence azimuthal angle (given by spacecraft spin; 5.6° or 11.2° resolution), and the incidence polar angle (given by the sectoring in the ToF unit; 22.5° sectors). Depending on the measurement mode the full energy sweep is performed 32 or 64 times per spin period thus providing a two-dimensional cut through the distribution function in polar angle every 156 ms or 78 ms. One complete three-dimensional ion distribution function is obtained in half a spin period (2.5 seconds). The instrument's axis of symmetry is perpendicular to the spacecraft spin axis and the spacecraft surface. TEAMS operates in a number of different data acquisition modes. The Survey Distribution mode samples H+, O+, He+, and He++ with high angle (64) and energy (48) resolution. Time resolution can be as low as 80 ms (slow survey) and as high as 10 ms (fast survey). High Mass Distribution mode uses a high mass (64) resolution to identify minor species; angle (16) and energy (16) resolution is low in this mode; time resolution varies from 80 ms (slow) to 20 ms (fast). Burst mode provides data for the four major ion species with the highest time (0.08 ms), angle (16), and energy (48) resolution. Additional measurement modes are geared towards the Pole Channels, Monitor Rates, and PHA Events.

=== Tri-Axial Fluxgate and Search-coil Magnetometers ===
The FAST magnetic field instrumentation includes a DC fluxgate magnetometer and an Alternating current (AC) search coil magnetometer. The fluxgate magnetometer is a three-axis instrument using highly stable low-noise ring core sensors. It is boom-mounted at 2 m (6 ft 7 in) from the spacecraft body in a shielded housing. It provides magnetic field information from DC to 100 Hz to a 16-bit analog-to-digital converter. Time resolution is 2 ms and the sensitivity below 50 Hz close to 1 nT. The search coil magnetometer (also boom-mounted) uses a three-axis sensor system that contains laminated permalloy cores, windings and preamplifiers. The design is based on the OGO-5 instrument with recent developments implemented on classified projects. The signals are further amplified in the electronics before analog-to-digital conversion. An AC magnetic field measurement is provided over the frequency range 10 Hz to 2.5 kHz with a time resolution of 0.1 ms and a frequency-dependent sensitivity between 10^-8 and 10^-10 nT^2/Hz.

== End of mission ==
FAST operations ended on 4 May 2009.

== See also ==
- Auroral kilometric radiation
- Explorer program
- Interbol
