= USA-200 =

American signals intelligence satellite

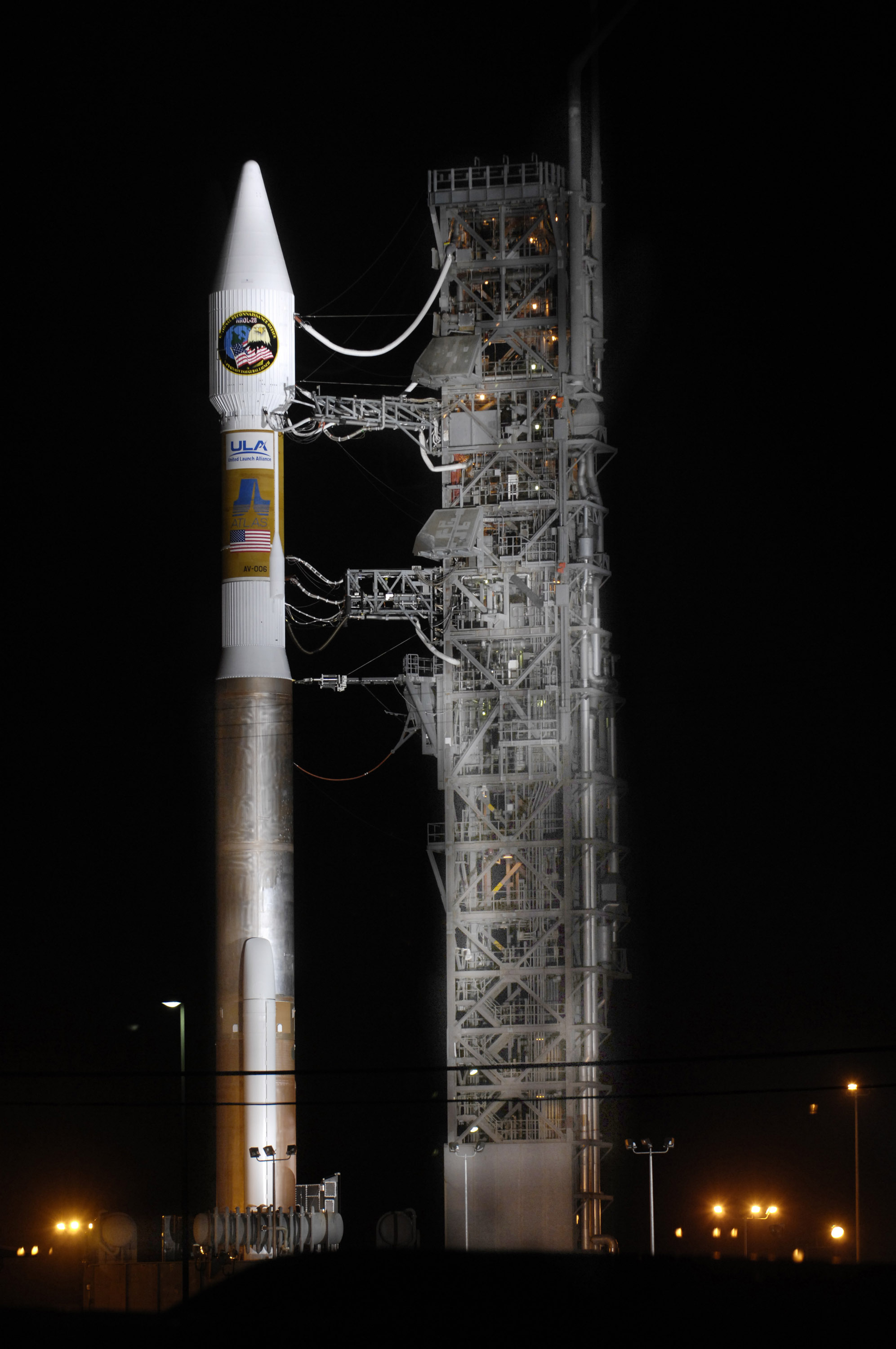
- Atlas V carrying NROL-28 satellite awaiting launch at SLC-3E
- Names: NROL-28
- Mission type: SIGINT
- Operator: United States NRO
- COSPAR ID: 2008-010A
- SATCAT no.: 32706

Start of mission
- Launch date: 13 March 2008, 10:02 UTC
- Rocket: Atlas V 411 (AV-006)
- Launch site: Vandenberg, SLC-3E
- Contractor: United Launch Alliance

Orbital parameters
- Reference system: Geocentric orbit
- Regime: Molniya orbit
- Perigee altitude: 1,112 km (691 mi)
- Apogee altitude: 37,580 km (23,350 mi)
- Inclination: 63.56°
- Period: 684.33 minutes

Instruments
- Space-Based Infrared System (SBIRS-HEO 2); Magnetospheric science instrument (TWINS-B)
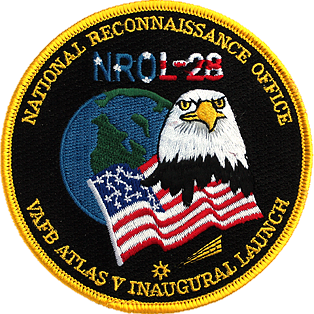
- NROL-28 mission patch

USA-200, also known as NRO Launch 28 or NROL-28, is an American signals intelligence satellite, operated by the National Reconnaissance Office. Launched in 2008, it has been identified as the second satellite in a series known as Improved Trumpet, Advanced Trumpet, or Trumpet follow-on; a replacement for the earlier Trumpet series of satellites.

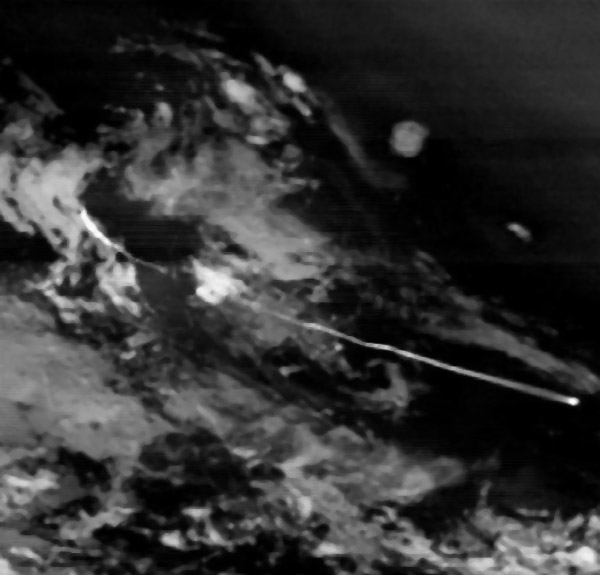
The infrared image of a Delta II rocket launch, captured by SBIRS-HEO sensors aboard USA-200.

== Launch ==
USA-200 was launched by an Atlas V launch vehicle, flying in the 411 configuration, operated by United Launch Alliance. The launch vehicle was the first Atlas V to launch from Vandenberg Air Force Base, flying from Space Launch Complex 3E. Liftoff occurred at 10:02 UTC on 13 March 2008. It was identified as NRO Launch 28, and was the thirteenth flight of an Atlas V. The launch vehicle had the tail number AV-006.

== Orbit ==
The satellite's orbit and mission are officially classified, however like most classified spacecraft it has been located and tracked by amateur observers. It is in a Molniya orbit with a perigee of 1,112 km (691 mi), an apogee of 37,580 km (23,350 mi), and 63.56° of orbital inclination and 684.33 minutes of orbital period.

== Instruments ==
In addition to its SIGINT payload, USA-200 also carries two secondary instruments; the SBIRS-HEO 2 missile detection payload as part of the Space-Based Infrared System programme, and NASA's TWINS-2 or TWINS-B magnetospheric science instrument as part of the TWINS programme.

== See also ==
- Explorer program
