= Koronas-Foton =

Russian research satellite

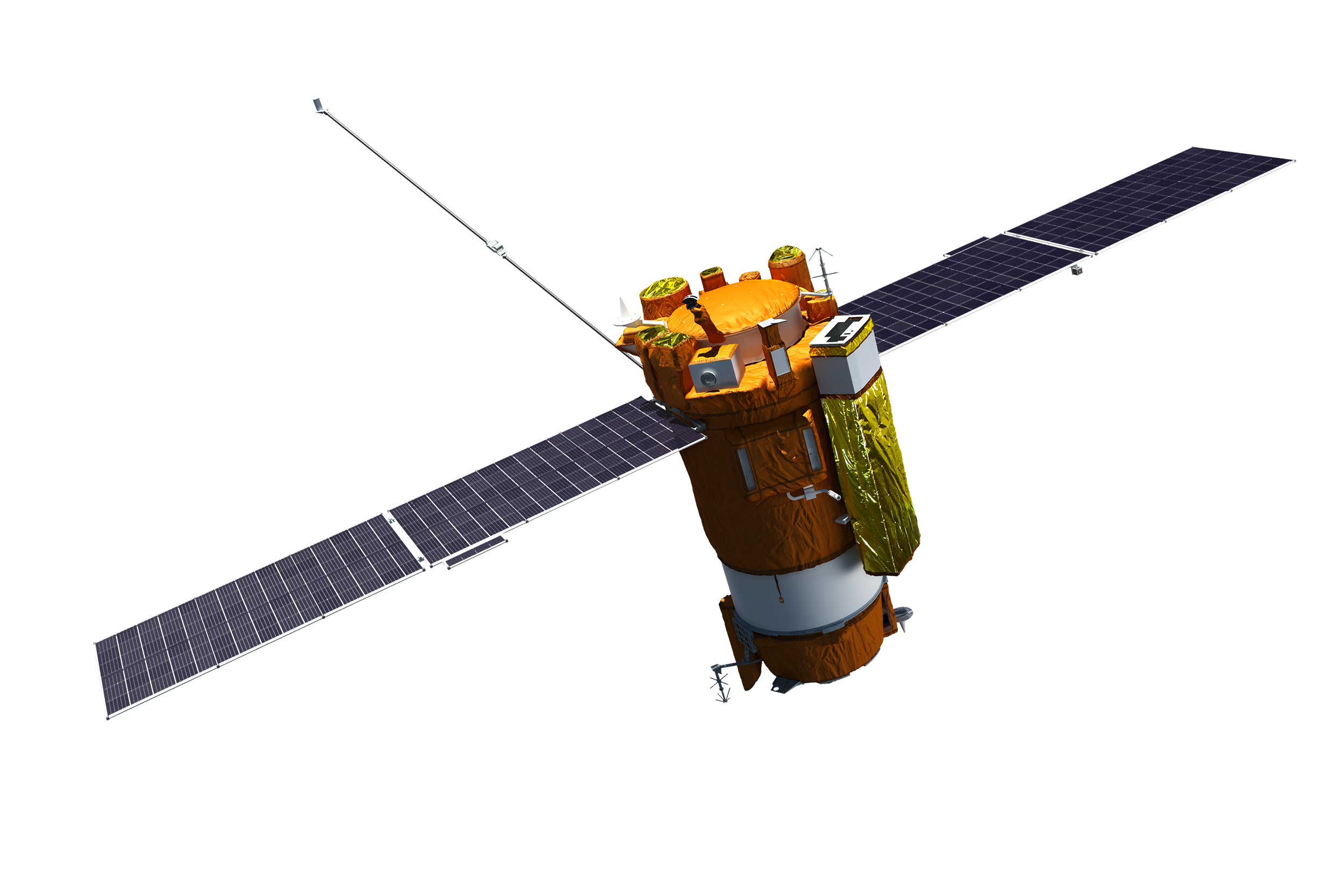
- Mission type: Solar research
- Operator: Roskosmos; MEPhI; NIIEM
- COSPAR ID: 2009-003A
- SATCAT no.: 33504
- Mission duration: 3 years planned 10 months achieved

Spacecraft properties
- Bus: Meteor-M
- Launch mass: 1,900 kilograms (4,200 lb)

Start of mission
- Launch date: 30 January 2009, 13:30:00 UTC
- Rocket: Tsyklon-3
- Launch site: Plesetsk 32/2

End of mission
- Disposal: Decommissioned after malfunction
- Deactivated: 1 December 2009

Orbital parameters
- Reference system: Geocentric
- Regime: Low Earth
- Perigee altitude: 529 kilometres (329 mi)
- Apogee altitude: 559 kilometres (347 mi)
- Inclination: 82.44 degrees
- Period: 95.39 minutes
- Epoch: 2 January 2014, 21:04:43 UTC

Koronas-Foton (Russian: Коронас-Фотон), also known as CORONAS-Photon (Complex Orbital Observations Near-Earth of Activity of the Sun-Photon), was a Russian solar research satellite. It was the third satellite in the Russian CORONAS programme, and part of the international Living With a Star programme. It was launched on 30 January 2009, from Site 32/2 at the Plesetsk Cosmodrome, aboard the final flight of the Tsyklon-3 rocket. On 1 December 2009 all scientific instruments on the satellite were turned off due to the problems with power supply that were caused by a design flaw. On 18 April 2010 the creators of the satellite announced it was lost "with a good deal of certainty".

== Overview ==
The goal was to investigate the processes of free energy accumulation in the Sun's atmosphere, accelerated particle phenomena and solar flares, and the correlation between solar activity and geomagnetic storms on Earth. Launch occurred successfully on 30 January 2009, and the first batch of science data was downloaded from the satellite on 19 February 2009. The satellite operated in a 500 x 500 km x 82.5° polar low Earth orbit and was expected to have an operational lifetime of three years. It encountered power system problems during the first eclipse season, about six months after launch, and contact with the satellite was lost on 1 December 2009. The satellite returned to life on December 29 after its solar panels received enough light to power its control systems, but attempts to revive the satellite failed, and the satellite was considered lost.

On 5 July 2009, Koronas-Foton's TESIS telescope registered the most powerful solar outburst of the year so far, lasting 11 minutes, from 06:07 to 06:18 GMT. Solar X-ray peak intensity reached С2.7 in a 5-level scale used to classify solar flares. The last equally powerful outburst occurred on 25 March 2008.

== Development ==
Koronas-Foton was a successor to the Koronas-F and Koronas-I satellites, launched in 1994 and 2001, respectively. It was being operated by the Russian Federal Space Agency, the Moscow Engineering Physics Institute (MIFI) and the All-Russian Scientific Research Institute of Electromechanics. It was built using a bus constructed for Meteor-M weather satellites,.

Koronas-Foton also carried three Indian Roentgen Telescope or RT instruments: RT-2/S, RT-2/G, and RT-2/CZT. They were used to conduct photometric and spectrometric research into the Sun, and for low-energy gamma-ray imagery. These instruments were operated by the Indian Space Research Organisation (ISRO), and were constructed by a collaboration of the Vikram Sarabhai Space Centre, Tata Institute of Fundamental Research and Indian Centre for Space Physics.

== Instruments ==
The satellite's scientific payload included an array of 12 instruments. Eight instruments were designed for registering electromagnetic radiation from the Sun in a wide range of the spectrum from near electromagnetic waves to gamma-radiation, as well as solar neutrons. Two instruments were designed to detect charged particles such as protons and electrons.

Scientific instruments:

1. Natalya-2M spectrometer by MIFI, Moscow, Russia
2. RT-2 gamma-telescope by TIFR/ICSP/VSSC, India.
3. Pingvin-M (Penguin) polarimeter by MIFI, Moscow, Russia
4. Konus-RF x-ray and gamma spectrometer by Ioffe Institute, Russia
5. BRM x-ray detector by MIFI, Russia
6. FOKA UV-detector by MIFI, Russia
7. TESIS telescope/spectrometer by FIAN, Russia, with SphinX soft X-ray spectrophotometer, SRC PAS, Poland
8. Electron-M-Peska charged particles analyser by NIIYaF MGU, Russia
9. STEP-F Electron and proton detector by Kharkov National University, Ukraine
10. SM-8M magnetometer by NPP Geologorazvedka/MIFI, Russia

Service systems:

1. SSRNI science data collection and registration system by IKI, Russia
2. Radio transmission system and antennas by RNII KP, Russia

== See also ==
- 2009 in spaceflight
