= Wind (spacecraft) =

NASA probe to study solar wind, at L1 since 1995

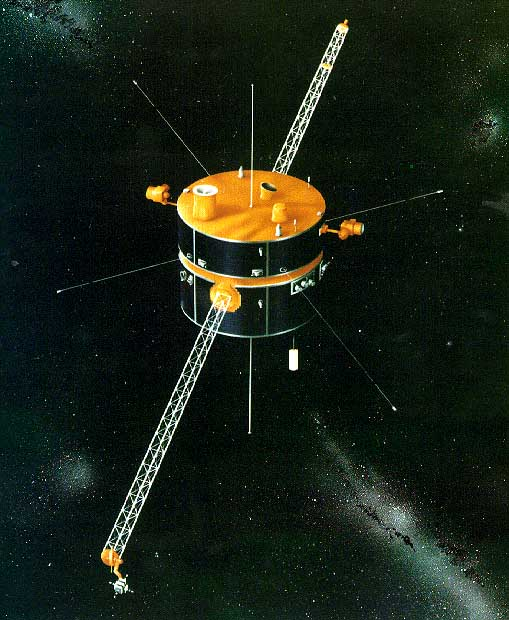
- Wind satellite is the first of NASA's Global Geospace Science program
- Names: GGS/Wind, ISTP/Wind, Interplanetary Physics Laboratory
- Mission type: Heliophysics
- Operator: NASA
- COSPAR ID: 1994-071A
- SATCAT no.: 23333
- Website: http://wind.nasa.gov/
- Mission duration: 3 years (planned); 32 years, 7 days (in progress)

Spacecraft properties
- Manufacturer: Martin Marietta
- Launch mass: 1,250 kg (2,760 lb)
- Dry mass: 950 kg (2,090 lb)
- Payload mass: 195 kg (430 lb)
- Dimensions: 2.4 × 1.8 m (7 ft 10 in × 5 ft 11 in)
- Power: 370 watts

Start of mission
- Launch date: 1 November 1994, 09:31:00 UTC
- Rocket: Delta II 7925-10 (Delta 227)
- Launch site: Cape Canaveral, SLC-17B
- Contractor: McDonnell Douglas

End of mission
- Last contact: 2040 (planned)

Orbital parameters
- Reference system: Heliocentric orbit
- Regime: L_{1} Lagrange point

Sun orbiter
- Orbital insertion: May 2004
Instruments
- 3DP: Three-Dimensional Plasma and Energetic Particle Investigation for the Wind Spacecraft
- TGRS: Transient Gamma-Ray Spectrometer
- MFI: Magnetic Field Investigation
- WAVES: Radio and Plasma Wave Experiment
- SWE: Solar Wind Experiment
- SMS: Solar Wind and Suprathermal Ion Composition Experiment
- KONUS: Gamma-Ray Burst Experiment
- EPACT: Energetic Particles: Acceleration, Composition, and Transport
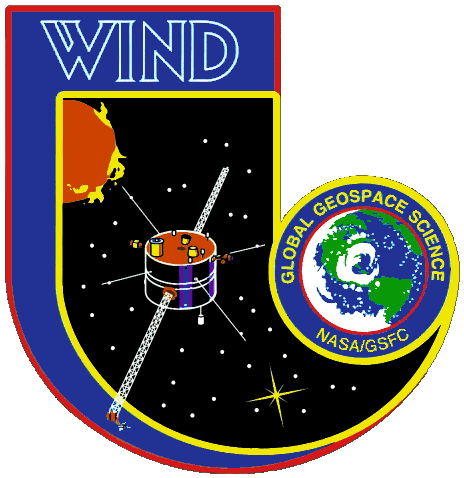
- Wind mission patch International Solar-Terrestrial Physics Science Initiative

The Global Geospace Science (GGS) Wind satellite is a NASA science spacecraft designed to study radio waves and plasma that occur in the solar wind and in the Earth's magnetosphere. It was launched on 1 November 1994, at 09:31:00 UTC, from launch pad LC-17B at Cape Canaveral Air Force Station (CCAFS) on Merritt Island, Florida, aboard a McDonnell Douglas Delta II 7925-10 rocket. Wind was designed and manufactured by Martin Marietta Astro Space Division in East Windsor Township, New Jersey. The satellite is a spin-stabilized cylindrical satellite with a diameter of 2.4 m (7 ft 10 in) and a height of 1.8 m (5 ft 11 in).

The spacecraft's original mission was to orbit the Sun at the L_{1} Lagrangian point, but this was delayed to study the magnetosphere and near lunar environment when the Solar and Heliospheric Observatory (SOHO) and Advanced Composition Explorer (ACE) spacecraft were sent to the same location. Wind has been at L_{1} continuously since May 2004, and is still operating as of 2024. As of 2024, Wind currently has enough fuel to last over 50 more years at L_{1}, until at least 2075. Wind continues to collect data, and by the end of 2025 had contributed data to over 8,515 scientific publications.

Mission operations are conducted from the Multi-Mission Operations Center (MMOC) in Building 14 at Goddard Space Flight Center in Greenbelt, Maryland. Wind data can be accessed using the SPEDAS software. Wind is the sister ship to GGS Polar.

== Science objectives ==
The aim of the International Solar-Terrestrial Physics Science Initiative is to understand the behaviour of the solar-terrestrial plasma environment, in order to predict how the Earth's atmosphere will respond to changes in solar wind conditions. Wind's objective is to measure the properties of the solar wind before it reaches the Earth.

- Provide complete plasma, energetic particle, and magnetic field input for magnetospheric and ionospheric studies.
- Determine the magnetospheric output to interplanetary space in the up-stream region.
- Investigate basic plasma processes occurring in the near-Earth solar wind.
- Provide baseline ecliptic plane observations to be used in heliospheric latitudes by the Ulysses mission.

== Instruments ==
The Wind spacecraft has an array of instruments including: KONUS, the Magnetic Field Investigation (MFI), the Solar Wind and Suprathermal Ion Composition Experiment (SMS), The Energetic Particles: Acceleration, Composition, and Transport (EPACT) investigation, the Solar Wind Experiment (SWE), a Three-Dimensional Plasma and Energetic Particle Investigation (3DP), the Transient Gamma-Ray Spectrometer (TGRS), and the Radio and Plasma Wave Investigation (WAVES). The KONUS and TGRS instruments are primarily for gamma-ray and high energy photon observations of solar flares or gamma-ray bursts and part of the Gamma-ray Coordinates Network. The SMS experiment measures the mass and mass-to-charge ratios of heavy ions. The SWE and 3DP experiments are meant to measure/analyze the lower energy (below 10 MeV) solar wind protons and electrons. The WAVES and MFI experiments were designed to measure the electric and magnetic fields observed in the solar wind. All together, the Wind spacecraft's suite of instruments allows for a complete description of plasma phenomena in the solar wind plane of the ecliptic.

=== Wind/WAVES ===
==== Time domain sampler ====
The electric field detectors of the Wind WAVES instrument are composed of three orthogonal electric field dipole antennas, two in the spin plane (roughly the plane of the ecliptic) of the spacecraft and one along the spin axis. The complete WAVES suite of instruments includes five total receivers including: Low Frequency FFT receiver called FFT (0.3 Hz to 11 kHz), Thermal Noise Receiver called TNR (4–256 kHz), Radio receiver band 1 called RAD1 (20–1040 kHz), Radio receiver band 2 called RAD2 (1.075–13.825 MHz), and the Time Domain Sampler called TDS (designed and built by the University of Minnesota). The longer of the two spin plane antenna, defined as E_{x}, is 100 m (330 ft) tip-to-tip while the shorter, defined as E_{y}, is 15 m (49 ft) tip-to-tip. The spin axis dipole, defined as E_{z}, is roughly 12 m (39 ft) tip-to-tip. When accounting for spacecraft potential, these antenna lengths are adjusted to ~41.1 m (135 ft), ~3.79 m (12.4 ft), and ~2.17 m (7 ft 1 in) [Note: these are subject to change and only estimates and not necessarily accurate to two decimal places]. The Wind WAVES instrument also detects magnetic fields using three orthogonal search coil magnetometers (designed and built by the University of Iowa). The XY search coils are oriented to be parallel to the XY dipole antenna. The search coils allow for high-frequency magnetic field measurements (defined as B_{x}, B_{y}, and B_{z}). The WAVES Z-axis is anti-parallel to the Z-GSE (Geocentric Solar Ecliptic) direction. Thus, any rotations can be done about the Z-axis in the normal Eulerian sense followed by a change of sign in the Z-component of any GSE vector rotated into WAVES coordinates.

Electric (and magnetic) field waveform captures can be obtained from the Time Domain Sampler (TDS) receiver. TDS samples are a waveform capture of 2048 points (16384 points on the STEREO spacecraft) per field component. The waveforms are measures of electric field versus time. In the highest sampling rates, the Fast (TDSF) sampler runs at ~120,000 samples per second (sps) and the Slow (TDSS) sampler runs at ~7,500 sps. TDSF samples are composed of two electric field components (typically E_{x} and E_{y}) while TDSS samples are composed of four vectors, either three electric and one magnetic field or three magnetic and one electric field. The TDSF receiver has little to no gain below about ~120 Hz and the search coil magnetometers roll off around ~3.3 Hz.

==== Thermal Noise Receiver ====
The TNR measures ~4–256 kHz electric fields in up to 5 logarithmically spaced frequency bands, though typically only set at 3 bands, from 32 or 16 channels per band, with a 7 nV/(Hz)^{1/2} sensitivity, 400 Hz to 6.4 kHz bandwidth, and total dynamic range in excess of 100 dB. The data are taken by two multi-channel receivers which nominally sample for 20 ms at a 1 MHz sampling rate (see Bougeret 1995 for more information). The TNR is often used to determine the local plasma density by observing the plasma line, an emission at the local upper hybrid frequency due to a thermal noise response of the wire dipole antenna. Observation of the plasma line requires the dipole antenna to be longer than the local Debye length, λ_{De}. For typical conditions in the solar wind λ_{De} ~7–20 m (23–66 ft), much shorter than the wire dipole antenna on Wind. The majority of this section was taken from.

=== Wind / 3DP ===
The Wind / 3DP instrument (designed and built at the Berkeley Space Sciences Laboratory) was designed to make full three-dimensional measurements of the distributions of suprathermal electrons and ions in the solar wind. The instrument includes three arrays, each consisting of a pair of double-ended semiconductor telescopes each with two or three closely sandwiched passivated ion implanted silicon detectors, which measure electrons and ions above ~20 keV. The instrument also has top-hat symmetrical spherical section electrostatic analyzers (ES) with microchannel plate detectors (MCPs) are used to measure ions and electrons from ~3 eV to 30 keV. The two types of detectors have energy resolutions ranging from ΔE/E ≈0.3 for the solid state telescopes (SST) and ΔE/E ≈ 0.2 for the top-hat ES analyzers. The angular resolutions are 22.5° × 36° for the SST and 5.6° (near the ecliptic) to 22.5° for the top-hat ES analyzers. The particle detectors can obtain a full 4π steradian coverage in one full(half) spin (~3 seconds) for the SST (top-hat ES analyzers). The majority of this section was taken from.

==== Electrostatic analyzers ====
The arrays of detectors are mounted on two opposing booms, each 0.5 m (1 ft 8 in) in length. The top-hat ES analyzers are composed of four separate detectors, each with different geometry factors to cover different ranges of energies. The electron detectors, EESA, and ion detectors, PESA, are each separated into low (L) and high (H) energy detectors. The H and L analyzers contain 24 and 16 discrete anodes, respectively. The anode layout provides a 5.6° angular resolution within ± 22.5° of the ecliptic plane (increases to 22.5° at normal incidence to ecliptic plane). The analyzers are swept logarithmically in energy and counters sample at 1024 samples/spin (~3 ms sample period). Thus the analyzers can be set to sample 64 energy samples per sweep at 16 sweeps per spin or 32 energy samples per sweep at 32 sweeps per spin, etc. The detectors are defined as follows:

- EESA Low (EL): covers electrons from ~3 eV to ~1 keV (These values vary from moment structure to moment structure depending on duration of data sampling, spacecraft potential, and whether in burst or survey mode. The typical range is ~5 eV to ~1.11 keV.) with an 11.25° spin phase resolution. EL has a total geometric factor of 1.3 × 10^{−2} E cm^{2}-sr (where E is energy in eV) with a nearly identical 180° field of view (FOV), radial to the spacecraft, to that of PESA-L.
- EESA High (EH): covers electrons from ~200 eV to ~30 keV (though typical values vary from a minimum of ~137 eV to a maximum of ~28 keV) in a 32 sample energy sweep each 11.25° of spacecraft spin. EH has a total geometric factor of 2.0 × 10^{−1} E cm^{2}-sr, MCP efficiency of about 70% and grid transmission of about 73%. EH has a 360° planar FOV tangent to the spacecraft surface which can be electro statically deflected into a cone up to ±45° out of its normal plane.
- PESA Low (PL): covers ions with a 14 sample energy sweep (Note that in survey mode the data structures typically take 25 data points at 14 different energies while in burst mode they take 64 data points at 14 different energies.) from ~100 eV to ~10 keV (often energies range from ~700 eV to ~6 keV) each 5.6° of spacecraft spin. PL has a total geometric factor of only 1.6 × 10^{−4} E cm^{2}-sr but an identical energy-angle response to that of PESA-H. While in the solar wind, PL reorients itself along the bulk flow direction to capture the solar wind flow which results in a narrow range of pitch-angle coverage.
- PESA High (PH): covers ions with a 15 sample energy sweep from as low as ~80 eV to as high as ~30 keV (typical energy range is ~500 eV to ~28 keV) each 11.25° of spacecraft (Note that PH has multiple data modes where the number of data points per energy bin can be any of the following: 121, 97, 88, 65, or 56). PH has a total geometric factor of 1.5 × 10^{−2} E cm^{2}-sr with a MCP efficiency of about 50% and grid entrance post transmission of about 75%.

The majority of this section was taken from Wilson III (2010).

==== Solid-state telescopes ====
The SST detectors consist of three arrays of double-ended telescopes, each of which is composed of either a pair or triplet of closely sandwiched semiconductor detectors. The center detector (Thick or T) of the triplet is 1.5 cm^{2} (0.23 sq in) in area, 500 μm thick, while the other detectors, foil (F) and open (O), are the same area but only 300 μm thick. One direction of the telescopes is covered in a thin lexan foil, ~1500 Angstrom (Å) of aluminum evaporated on each side to eliminate sunlight, (SST-Foil) where the thickness was chosen to stop protons up to the energy of electrons (~400 keV). Electrons are essentially unaffected by the foil. On the opposite side (SST-Open), a common broom magnet is used to refuse electrons below ~400 keV from entering but leaves the ions essentially unaffected. Thus, if no higher energy particles penetrate the detector walls, the SST-Foil should only measure electrons and the SST-Open only ions. Each double-ended telescope has two 36° × 20° FWHM FOV, thus each end of the five telescopes can cover a 180° × 20° piece of space. Telescope 6 views the same angle to spin axis as telescope 2, but both ends of telescope 2 have a drilled tantalum cover to reduce the geometric factor by a factor of 10 to measure the most intense fluxes. The SST-Foil data structures typically have 7 energy bins each with 48 data points while the SST-Open has 9 energy bins each with 48 data points. Both detectors have energy resolutions of ΔE/E ≈ 30%. The majority of this section was taken from.

=== Wind / MFI ===
The Magnetic Field Instrument (MFI) on board Wind is composed of dual triaxial fluxgate magnetometers. The MFI has a dynamic range of ±4 nT to ±65,536 nT, digital resolution ranging from ±0.001 nT to ±16 nT, sensor noise level of < 0.006 nT (R.M.S.) for 0–10 Hz signals, and sample rates varying from 44 samples per second (sps) in snapshot memory to 10.87 sps in standard mode. The data are also available in averages at 3 seconds, 1 minute, and 1 hour. The data sampled at higher rates (i.e. >10 sps) is referred to as High Time Resolution (HTR) data in some studies.

=== Wind / SWE ===
The Wind spacecraft has two Faraday Cup (FC) ion instruments. The SWE FCs can produce reduced ion distribution functions with up to 20 angular and 30 energy per charge bins every 92 seconds. Each sensor has a ~15° tilt above or below the spin plane and an energy range from ~150 eV to ~8 keV. A circular aperture limits the effects of aberration near the modulator grid and defines the collecting area of the collector plates in each FC. The FCs sample at a set energy for each spacecraft rotation, then step up the energy for the next rotation. Since there are up to 30 energy bins for these detectors, a full reduced distribution function requires 30 rotations or slightly more than 90 seconds.

=== Wind / KONUS and TGRS ===
KONUS remains a very active partner in the Gamma-ray Coordinates Network (GCN) and the Interplanetary Network. Notifications of astrophysical transients are sent worldwide instantly from KONUS, and are of importance in the subsequent positioning of telescopes everywhere. Thus, the instrument remains an active contributor to the astrophysical community, for instance, with the Neil Gehrels Swift Observatory (Swift mission).

The TGRS instrument was shut off early in the mission due to the planned expiration of coolant.

=== Wind / EPACT ===
The Energetic Particles: Acceleration, Composition and Transport (EPACT) investigation consists of multiple telescopes including: the Low Energy Matrix Telescope (LEMT); SupraThermal Energetic Particle telescope (STEP); and ELectron-Isotope TElescope system (ELITE). ELITE is composed of two Alpha-Proton-Electron (APE) telescopes and an Isotope Telescope (IT).

EPACT Telescope Summary
	LEMT	APE-A	APE-B	IT	STEP
Charge Range	2 to 90	−1 to 26	−1 to 26	2 to 26	2 to 26
Energy Ranges
Electrons (MeV)	N/A	0.2–2.0	1–10	N/A	N/A
Hydrogen (MeV)	1.4–10	4.6–25	19–120	N/A	N/A
Helium (MeV/nucl)	1.4–10	4.6–25	19–500	3.4–55	0.04–8.1
Iron (MeV/nucl)	2.5–50	15–98	73–300	12–230	0.02–1.2
Geometry Factor (cm^{2}/sr)	3 × 17	1.2	1.3	~9.0	2 × 0.4

The highest energy telescopes (APE and IT) failed early in the mission, though APE does two channels of ~5 and ~20 MeV protons but IT was turned off. However, LEMT (covering energies in the 1–10 MeV/nucl range) and STEP (measuring ions heavier than protons in the 20 keV–1 MeV/nucl range) still continue to provide valuable data.

=== Wind / SMS ===
The Solar Wind and Suprathermal Ion Composition Experiment (SMS) on Wind is composed of three separate instruments: SupraThermal Ion Composition Spectrometer (STICS); high-resolution mass spectrometer (MASS); and Solar Wind Ion Composition Spectrometer (SWICS). STICS determines the mass, mass per charge, and energy for ions in the energy range of 6–230 keV/e. MASS determines elemental and isotopic abundances from 0.5 to 12 keV/e. SWICS determines mass, charge, and energy for ions in the energy range of 0.5 to 30 keV/e. The SWICS "stop" microchannel plate detector (MCP) experienced a failure resulting in reduced capabilities for this instrument and was eventually turned off in May 2000. The SMS data processing unit (DPU) experienced a latch-up reset on 26 June 2009, that placed the MASS acceleration/deceleration power supply into a fixed voltage mode, rather than stepping through a set of voltages. In 2010, MASS experienced a small degradation in the acceleration/deceleration power supply which reduced the efficiency of the instrument, though this does not seriously affect science data analysis.

SMS Instruments
	SWICS	MASS	STICS
Ion Species	H–Fe	He–Ni	H–Fe
Mass/Charge Range (amu/e)	1–30	N/A	1–60
Energy Range (keV/e)	0.5–30	0.5–11.6	8–226
Mean Speed Range (km/s)
H^{+}	310–2400	N/A	N/A
O^{6+}	190–1470	200–900	N/A
Fe^{10+}	130–1010	200–500	N/A
Total Geometry Factor (cm^{2}/sr)
cm^{2}/sr	2.3 × 10^{−3}	N/A	0.05
cm^{2}	1.8 × 10^{−2}	0.35	N/A
Dynamic Range	10^{10}	10^{10}	5 × 10^{10}

== Discoveries ==
1. Observation of relationship between large-scale solar wind-magnetosphere interactions and magnetic reconnection at the terrestrial magnetopause.
2. First statistical study of high frequency (≥1 kHz) electric field fluctuations in the ramp of interplanetary (IP) shocks. The study found that the amplitude of ion acoustic waves (IAWs) increased with increasing fast mode Mach number and shock compression ratio. They also found that the IAWs had the highest probability of occurrence in the ramp region.
3. Observation of the largest whistler wave using a search coil magnetometer in the radiation belts.
4. First observation of shocklets upstream of a quasi-perpendicular IP shock.
5. First simultaneous observations of whistler mode waves with electron distributions unstable to the whistler heat flux instability.
6. First observation of an electrostatic solitary wave at an IP shock with an amplitude exceeding 100 mV/m.
7. First observation of electron-Berstein-like waves at an IP shock.
8. First observation of the source region of an IP Type II radio burst.
9. First evidence for Langmuir wave coupling to Z-mode waves.
10. First evidence to suggest that the observed bi-polar ES structures in the shock transition region are consistent with BGK modes or electron phase space holes.
11. First evidence of a correlation between the amplitude of electron phase space holes and the change in electron temperature.
12. First evidence of three-wave interactions in the terrestrial foreshock using bi-coherence.
13. First evidence of proton temperature anisotropy constraints due to mirror, firehose, and ion cyclotron instabilities.
14. First evidence of Alfvén-cyclotron dissipation.
15. First (shared with STEREO spacecraft) observation of electron trapping by a very large amplitude whistler wave in the radiation belts (also seen in STEREO observations).
16. First observation of Langmuir and whistler waves in the lunar wake.
17. First evidence of direct evidence of electron cyclotron resonance with whistler mode waves driven by a heat flux instability in the solar wind.
18. First evidence of local field-aligned ion beam generation by foreshock electromagnetic waves called short large amplitude magnetic structures or SLAMS, which are soliton-like waves in the magnetosonic mode.
19. Observation of interplanetary and interstellar dust particle impacts, with over 100,000 impacts recorded as of 2019.
20. First evidence of connection between a fast radio burst and a magnetar with the Milky Way galaxy. The press release can be found at Fast Radio Bursts. This work led to at least six papers published in Nature.
21. First observation of a giant flare — emission of greater apparent intensity than gamma ray bursts with an average occurrence rate of once per decade — within the nearby Sculptor Galaxy. The press release can be found at Giant Flare in Nearby Galaxy. This work led to at least six papers published in Nature.

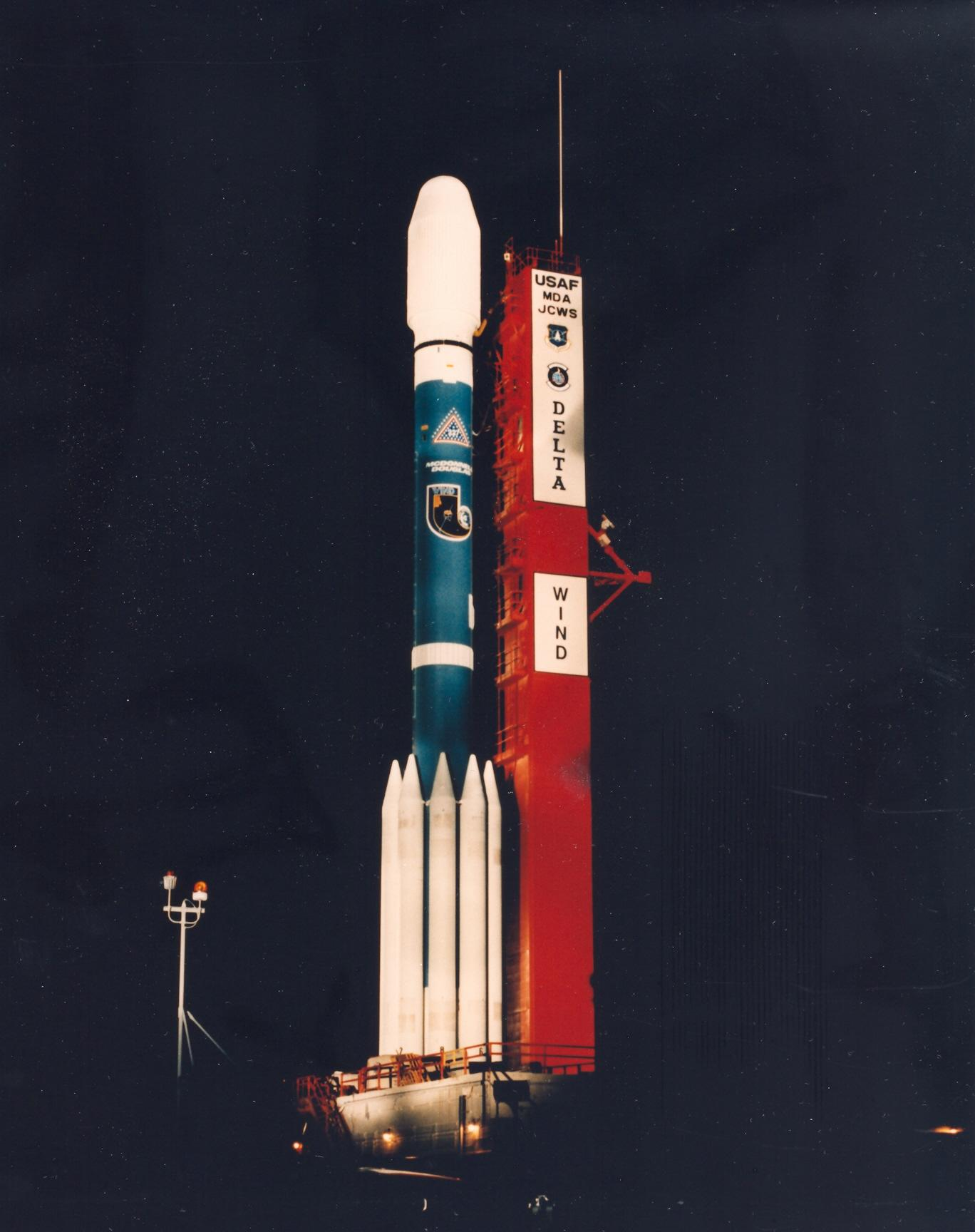
Wind spacecraft in fairing on Delta II launch vehicle waiting for launch.

A comprehensive review of the contributions made by Wind to science was published in Reviews of Geophysics by and highlighted by the journal in an Editors' Vox on the Eos (magazine) website.

== List of refereed publications for Wind ==
For a complete list of refereed publications directly or indirectly using data from the Wind spacecraft, see https://wind.nasa.gov/bibliographies.php.

Wind continues to produce relevant research, with its data having contributed to over 6000 publications since 1 January 2010 and over 2490 publications prior. As of 24 April 2026 (not including 2026 publications), the total number of publications either directly or indirectly using Wind data is ~8516, or an average of ~275 publications/year (the average since 2020 is ~517 publications/year or ~3102 publications since 2020).Wind data has been used in over 145 high impact refereed publications with ~16 in Science, ~92 in Nature Publishing Group (includes Nature, Nature Physics, Nature Communications, Scientific Reports, and Scientific American), and ~38 in Physical Review Letters. Many of these publications utilized Wind data directly and indirectly by citing the OMNI dataset at CDAWeb, which relies heavily upon Wind measurements.

== Science highlights in the news ==
- An April 2012 paper makes NASA's homepage news.
- A March 2013 paper using data from the Wind spacecraft was highlighted as a Physical Review Letters Spotlight article and a NASA Feature Article.
- An April 2013 paper was highlighted on the NASA website.
- A September 2014 paper was highlighted on the NASA website and at Popular Science.
- Wind celebrated the 20th anniversary of its launch on November 1, 2014, highlighted on NASA's homepage.
- A November 2016 paper primarily using THEMIS observations and utilizing data from the Wind spacecraft was published in Physical Review Letters and selected as an Editors' Suggestion article, and was highlighted on the NASA and THEMIS Science Nuggest sites.
- Wind data was used in a June 2019 paper showing that ions are heated in a preferential zone close to the solar surface, at altitudes that will be visited by Parker Solar Probe in roughly two years.
- Wind celebrated the 25th anniversary of its launch on 1 November 2019, highlighted in a NASA feature article.
- Wind/ KONUS data was used to show, for the first time, that fast radio bursts may originate from magnetars, highlighted by NASA at Fast Radio Bursts on 4 November 2020.
- Wind/ KONUS data helped provide evidence of the first giant flare in the nearby Sculptor Galaxy, highlighted by NASA at Giant Flare in Nearby Galaxy on 13 January 2021.
- Wind/ LEMT data helped to pinpoint the source region of solar energetic particles, highlighted by NASA at Scientists Trace Fastest Solar Particles to Their Roots on 10 March 2021.
- Wind/ KONUS data helped to detect one of the strongest/brightest gamma-ray burst (GRB) events on record, with a total energy output of 10^{54} ergs (or 10^{47} J). The story is highlighted on 13 October 2022 at Exceptional Cosmic Blast.
- Wind celebrated the 28th anniversary of its launch on 1 November 2022.
- On 21 February 2023 the Wind review paper published in Reviews of Geophysics was awarded as a Top Cited Article 2021-2022 by the journal.
- Wind celebrated the 30th anniversary of its launch on 1 November 2024 and highlighted in a NASA story 30 Years On, NASA's Wind Is a Windfall for Studying our Neighborhood in Space.
- Wind was highlighted in a NASA story about bonus science resulting from NASA missions 5 Surprising NASA Heliophysics Discoveries Not Related to the Sun.

== Awards ==
- The Wind Operations Team at NASA's Goddard Space Flight Center received the NASA Group Achievement Award in June 2015 for recovery of the Wind spacecraft's command and attitude processor.
- The Wind Operations Team at NASA's Goddard Space Flight Center received the AIAA Space Operations & Support Award on 2 September 2015. The award honors the team's "exceptional ingenuity and personal sacrifice in the recovery of NASA's Wind spacecraft". Jacqueline Snell, engineering manager for the Wind, Geotail, and Advanced Composition Explorer (ACE) missions, accepted the award on behalf of the team.
- In 2019, Lynn B. Wilson III, the project scientist for Wind, was awarded NASA's Exceptional Scientific Achievement Medal.

== See also ==
- List of active Solar System probes
- List of heliophysics missions
- Timeline of Solar System exploration
- Advanced Composition Explorer (ACE), launched 1997, still operational
- Cassini–Huygens
- Cluster
- Helios
- Magnetospheric Multiscale Mission (MMS)
- MESSENGER (Mercury Surface, Space Environment, Geochemistry and Ranging), launched 2004, decommissioned April 30, 2015
- Solar Dynamics Observatory (SDO), launched 2010, still operational
- Solar and Heliospheric Observatory (SOHO), launched 1995, still operational
- Solar Maximum Mission (SMM), launched 1980, decommissioned 1989
- Solar Orbiter (SOLO), launched in February 2020
- Parker Solar Probe, launched in 2018
- STEREO (Solar Terrestrial Relations Observatory), launched 2006, one of two spacecraft still operational
- Time History of Events and Macroscale Interactions during Substorms (THEMIS), launched 2007, still operational
- TRACE (Transition Region and Coronal Explorer), launched 1998, decommissioned 2010
- Van Allen Probes (formerly called Radiation Belt Storm Probes), launched 2012, decommissioned 2019
