= TWINS =

NASA Experiments of the Explorer program

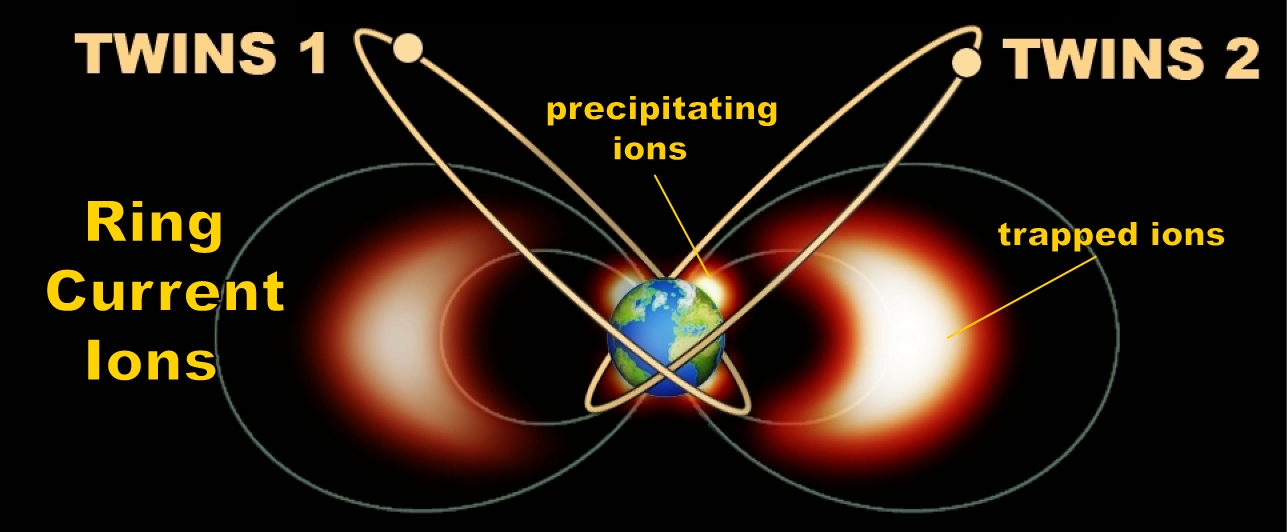
- TWINS 1 and TWINS 2 in simultaneous Molniya orbits, obtain stereo images of the Earth's ring current, including signals from both trapped ions and precipitating ions.
- Operator: NASA
- Instrument type: Spectrometer
- Function: Magnetospheric
- Mission duration: 2 years (planned)
- Website: http://twins.swri.edu/index.jsp

Properties
- Number launched: 2

Host spacecraft
- Spacecraft: USA-184; USA-200
- Operator: NRO
- Orbit: Molniya

Two Wide-Angle Imaging Neutral-Atom Spectrometers (TWINS) are a pair of NASA instruments aboard two United States National Reconnaissance Office (NRO) satellites in Molniya orbits. TWINS was designed to provide stereo images of the Earth's ring current. The first instrument, TWINS-1, was launched aboard USA-184 on 28 June 2006. TWINS-2 followed aboard USA-200 on 13 March 2008.

Each instrument consists of an energetic neutral atom imager and a Lyman alpha detector. The ENA imager provides indirect remote sensing of the ring current ions, and the Lyman alpha detector gives a measure of the neutral hydrogen cloud about the Earth, known as the geocorona. The TWINS prime mission lasted two years, from 2008 to 2010, and has been followed by an extended mission which is ongoing.

== Mission ==
Launched as missions of opportunity (MoO) aboard classified, non-NASA U.S. government spacecraft, TWINS conducts stereoscopic imaging of Earth's magnetosphere. By imaging the charge exchange neutral atoms over a broad energy range (~1-100 keV) using two identical instruments on two widely spaced high-altitude, high-inclination spacecraft, TWINS enables the 3-dimensional visualization and the resolution of large scale structures and dynamics within the magnetosphere for the first time. In contrast to traditional space experiments, which make measurements at only one point in space, imaging experiments provide simultaneous viewing of different regions of the magnetosphere. Stereo imaging, as done by TWINS, takes the next step of producing 3D images, and provides a leap ahead in our understanding of the global aspects of the terrestrial magnetosphere.

The ENA imagers observe energetic neutrals produced from the global magnetospheric ion population, over an energy range of 1 to 100 keV with high angular (4°) and time (about 1-minute) resolution. A Lyman-alpha geocoronal imager is used to monitor cold exospheric hydrogen atoms that produce ENAs from ions via charge exchange. Complementing these imagers are detectors that measure the local charged particle environment around the spacecraft. The offset in the orbital phases (apogees at different times) of TWINS 1 and TWINS 2 means that in addition to stereo ENA imaging for several hours twice per day, the two TWINS instruments also obtain essentially continuous magnetospheric observations. The TWINS instrumentation is essentially the same as the MENA instrument on the IMAGE spacecraft. This instrumentation consists of a neutral atom imager covering the ~1-100 keV energy range with 4° x 4° angular resolution and 1-minute time resolution, and a simple Lyman-alpha imager to monitor the geocorona.

TWINS provides stereo imaging of the Earth's magnetosphere, the region surrounding the planet controlled by its magnetic field and containing the Van Allen radiation belts and other energetic charged particles. TWINS enables three-dimensional global visualization of this region, leading to greatly enhanced understanding of the connections between different regions of the magnetosphere and their relation to the solar wind.

== Operation and storm events ==
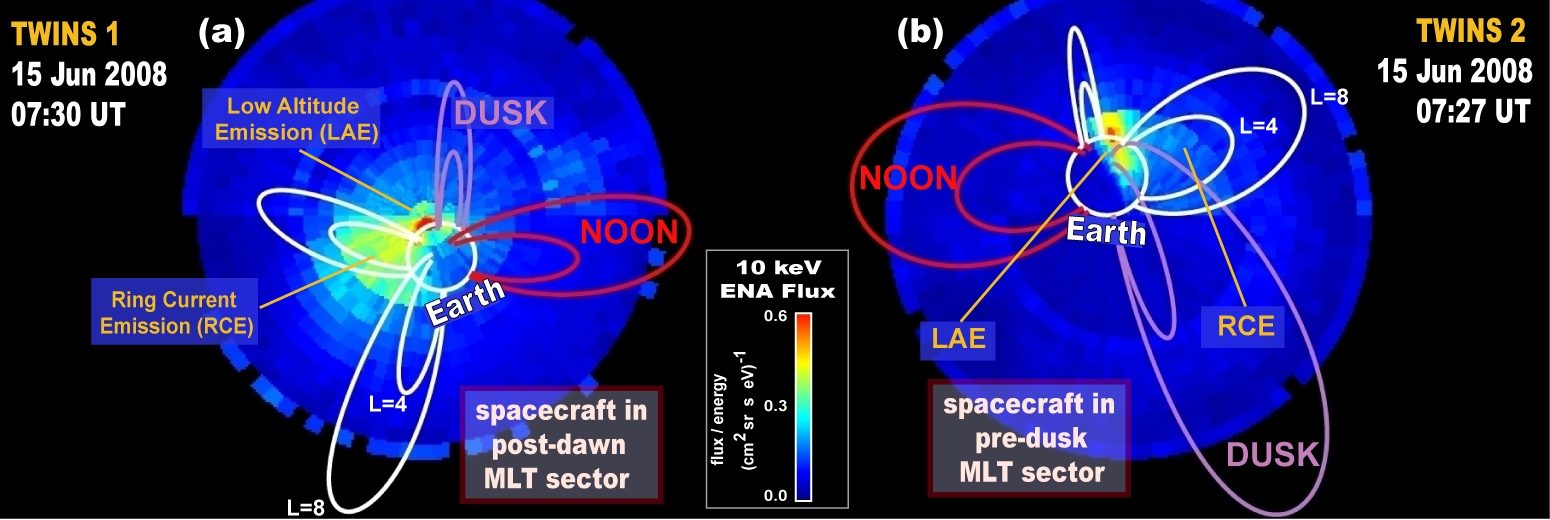
This is a first-light stereo ENA image of the terrestrial ring current obtained by TWINS on 15 June 2008 for 10 keV energy. Visible in each image are both low-altitude emissions (LAE) from precipitating ions, and high-altitude ring current emissions (RCE). For reference, the Earth's limb is drawn in, along with dipole magnetic field lines at four cardinal local times (noon=red, dusk=lavender, midnight, and dawn) and two L-values (L=4 and L=8).

Routine stereo imaging by TWINS began on 15 June 2008, during an extremely weak geomagnetic storm whose Dst index never fell below -40 nT, as compared to a nominal Dst of -100 nT for classification as a storm. During the TWINS prime mission (2008–2010), an extended and unprecedented solar minimum (from solar cycle 23) prevailed, bringing with it very calm magnetospheric conditions ranging from dead quiet to mildly disturbed. During this time period TWINS observed numerous weak storms, roughly once every 27 days (corresponding to the solar rotation period and triggered by solar corotating interaction regions (CIRs). The strongest storm (which was still very mild) observed by TWINS during its prime mission was on 22 July 2009, with Dst reaching a moderate -79 nT. Throughout these extended quiet conditions TWINS images contained ENA signals from both high-altitude (ring current) and low-altitude emission (LAE) regions.

The TWINS Mission of Opportunity maintains a library of selected storm events.

== Instruments ==
Name	Launch name	Spacecraft	Launch date (UTC)	Launch site	Rocket	Orbit	Remarks
TWINS-1	TWINS-A	USA-184	28 June 2006; 03:30:00	VAFB, SLC-6	Delta IV-M+(4,2)	1,138 × 39,210 km (707 × 24,364 mi) x 63.2°	
TWINS-2	TWINS-B	USA-200	13 March 2008; 10:02	VAFB, SLC-3E	Atlas V 411	1,652 × 38,702 km (1,027 × 24,048 mi) x 63.4°	

== See also ==
- STEREO Two spacecraft launched into heliocentric orbit in 2006 to provide stereographic imagery of the Sun
- List of heliophysics missions
- Temperature and Winds for InSight (TWINS, sensor package on InSight Mars lander)
