= RELIKT-1 =

Soviet cosmic microwave background experiment on the Prognoz 9 satellite

- Wavelength: 37 GHz (8.1 mm)
- First light: 1 July 1983
- Decommissioned: February 1984
- Angular resolution: 5.8 degree

RELIKT-1 from Russian: РЕЛИКТ-1 (Note: From Russian: реликтовое излучение, lit. 'relict radiation' meaning 'cosmic microwave background') (sometimes RELICT-1) was a Soviet cosmic microwave background anisotropy experiment launched on board the Prognoz 9 satellite on 1 July 1983. It operated until February 1984. It was the first CMB satellite (followed by the Cosmic Background Explorer in 1989) and measured the CMB dipole, the Galactic plane, and gave upper limits on the quadrupole moment.

A follow-up, RELIKT-2, would have been launched around 1993, and a RELIKT-3 was proposed, but neither took place due to the dissolution of the Soviet Union.

== Launch and observations ==
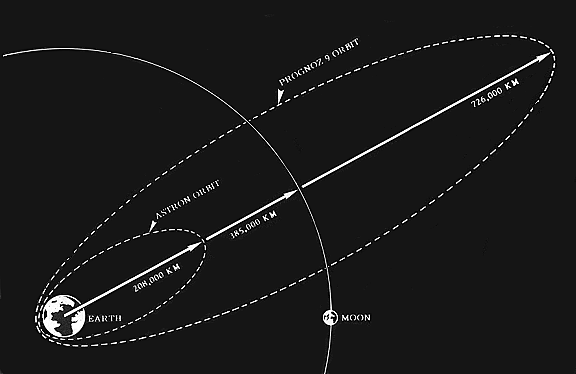
Prognoz 9 orbit

RELIKT-1 was launched on board the Prognoz-9 satellite on 1 January 1983. The satellite was in a highly eccentric orbit, with perigee around 1,000 km and apogee around 750,000 km, and an orbital period of 26 days.

RELIKT-1 observed at 37 GHz (8 mm), with a bandwidth of 0.4 GHz and an angular resolution of 5.8°. It used a superheterodyne, or Dicke-type modulation radiometer with an automatic balancer for the two input levels with a 30-second time constant. The noise in 1 second was 31mK, with a system temperature of 300K, and a receiver temperature of 110K. The signal was sampled twice a second, and the noise was correlated between samples.

The receiver used two corrugated horn antennas, one pointing parallel to the spacecraft spin axis, the other pointing at a parabolic antenna to point at 90° from the spin axis. The satellite rotated every 120 seconds. The experiment weight 30 kilograms (66 lb), and consumed 50W of power.

The radiometer was calibrated to 5% accuracy before launch, as was an internal noise source (which was used every four days during observations). Additionally the moon was used as a calibrator, as it was observed twice a month, and the in-flight system temperatures were measured to vary by 4% on a weekly basis.

The satellite rotation axis was kept constant for a week, giving 5040 scans of a great circle, after which it was changed to a new axis. The signal was recorded onto a tape recorder, and transmitted to Earth every four days. It observed for 6 months, giving 31 different scans that covered the whole sky, all of which intersected at the ecliptic poles. The experiment ceased observations in February 1984, after collecting 15 million measurements.

== Results ==
It measured the CMB dipole, the Galactic plane, and reported constraints on the quadrupole moment.

The first dipole measurement was reported in 1984, while the telescope was still observing, at 2.1±0.5mK, and upper limits on the quadrupole of 0.2mK. It also detected brighter-than-expected Galactic plane emission from compact HII regions.

A reanalysis of the data by Strukov et al. in 1992 found a quadrupole $(\Delta T/T)_{quad}$ between $6\times10^{-6}$ and $3.3\times10^{-5}$ at 90% confidence level, and also reported a negative anomaly at l=150°, b=-70° at a 99% confidence level,

Another reanalysis of the data by Klypin, Stukov and Skulachev in 1992 found a dipole of 3.15±0.12mK, with a direction of 11h17m±10m and -7.5°±2.5°. It placed a limit on the CMB quadrupole of $(\Delta T/T)_{quad} = 1.5 \times 10^{-5}$ with a 95% confidence level, assuming a Harrison-Zeldovich spectrum, or $<3.0\times10^{-5}$ without assuming a model. The results were close to those measured by the Cosmic Background Explorer and the Tenerife Experiment.

== RELIKT-2 ==
The second RELIKT satellite would have been launched in mid-1993. It would have had five channels to observe at 21.7 (13.8), 24.5 (8.7), 59.0 (5.1), 83.0 (3.6) and 193 GHz (1.6mm), using degenerated paramps. It would have had corrugated horns to give a resolution of 7°, and a more distant orbit to avoid contamination from the Moon and Sun, with a mission duration around 2 years, to give a better sensitivity than COBE. It would have been cooled to 100K. It was constructed, and was undergoing tests in 1992. It would have been launched as the Libris satellite on a Molniya rocket. The launch was put back to 1996, with expanded plans to observe with 1.5-3° resolution from two spacecraft in 1995, but ultimately never took place because of the Soviet Union's break-up and lack of funding.

A RELIKT-3 was also planned, which would have observed at 34–90 GHz with a resolution around 1°.
