= Hiroshi Matsumoto (engineer) =

Japanese engineer and atmospheric scientist (1942–2025)

- 松本 紘
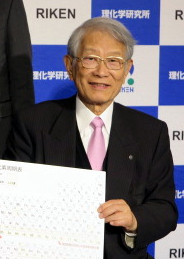
- Matsumoto in 2016
- Born: November 17, 1942; Zhangjiakou, China
- Died: June 15, 2025 (aged 82)
- Education: Kyoto University
- Engineering career
- Discipline: Atmospheric science
- Institutions: RIKEN
- Employer: Kyoto University
- Awards: Tanaka-kan Award

Hiroshi Matsumoto (松本 紘, Matsumoto Hiroshi; November 17, 1942 – June 15, 2025) was a Japanese engineer and atmospheric scientist. He was the president of Kyoto University until August 2014, and then served as the president of RIKEN until March 2022. He was a member of the Japanese government's committee on space policy. He had a Doctorate in Engineering (1973, Kyoto University). He was born in Zhangjiakou, China.

His research centered on plasma in the geomagnetosphere and cosmosphere. He developed the KEMPO (Kyoto university ElectroMagnetic Particle) code to reproduce the dynamics of the physical processes of space plasma. He led the plasma wave Geotail observations, and helped elucidate mechanisms of excitation, such as electrostatic solitary waves. He also worked on studies for the practical application of microwave power transmission in space. Matsumoto died on June 15, 2025, at the age of 82.

== Career ==
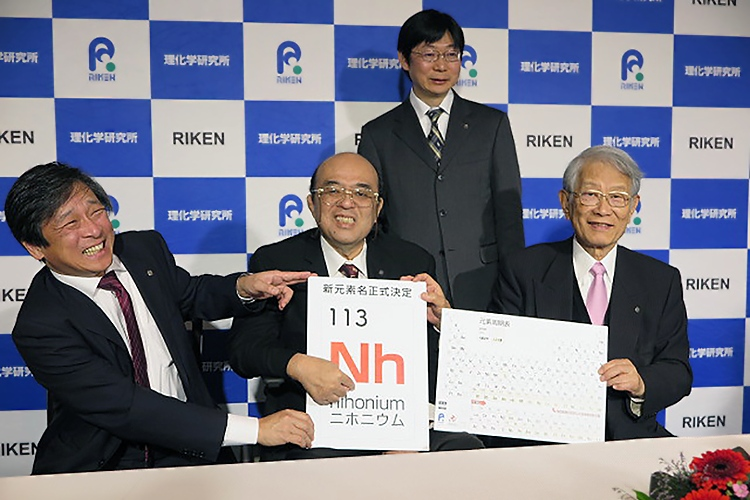
With Hideto En'yo, Kōsuke Morita and Kōji Morimoto (in Fukuoka City, Fukuoka Prefecture on December 1, 2016)

- 1967: Research assistant at Faculty of Engineering, Kyoto University
- 1974: Assistant Professor of Faculty of Engineering, Kyoto University
- 1981: Assistant Professor of Radio Atmospheric Science Center (RASC), Kyoto University
- 1987: Professor of RASC, Kyoto University
- 1992–1998: Director of RASC, Kyoto University
- 2000: Professor of Radio Science Center for Space and Atmosphere, Kyoto University
- 2002: Director of Radio Science Center for Space and Atmosphere, Kyoto University
- 2004: Professor of Research Institute for Sustainable Humanosphere (RISH), Kyoto University
- 2005: Director of RISH, Kyoto University
- 2005: Executive Vice-President (Research and Finance), Kyoto University
- 2006: Professor Emeritus, Kyoto University
- 2008–2014: President, Kyoto University
- 2015–2022: President, RIKEN

== Organizations ==
- 1999 – Chairman of International Union of Radio Science (URSI)
- 1999 – Chairman of Society of Geomagnetism and Earth, Planetary and Space Sciences (SGEPSS)
- 1999 – Fellow of American Geophysical Union (AGU)
- 2003 – Fellow of the Institute of Electrical and Electronics Engineers (IEEEE)
- 2004 – Foreign honorary member of Royal Astronomical Society (RAS)
- 2005 – Fellow of the Institute of Electronics, Information and Communication Engineers (IEICE)

== Bibliography ==
- The Computer and Space Development (1996) (宇宙開拓とコンピュータ) ISBN 978-4320028357
- Cosmology of Kyoto University (2009) (京の宇宙学) ISBN 978-4764955004
- Space Solar Power Plant (2011) (宇宙太陽光発電所) ISBN 978-4799310168
- Change the University from Kyoto (2014) (京都から大学を変える) ISBN 978-4396113629

== Prizes ==
- 1975 – "Study of Whistler mode wave particle interaction over the magnetosphere plasma" was awarded the Tanaka-kan Award by the Japan Society of Geomagnetism and Earth, Planetary and Space Sciences
- 2006 – Awarded the Yuri Gagarin Medal from the Russian Federation of Cosmonautics
- 2006 – Awarded the Minister of Education, Culture, Sports, Science and Science and Technology Award
- 2007 – Awarded the Purple Ribbon Medal
- 2008 – Awarded the 2008 Booker Gold Medal from the International Radio Science Union
- 2017 – Asian Scientist 100, Asian Scientist
- 2021 – Awarded the Grand Cordon of the Order of the Sacred Treasure
