= CORONAS programme =

Complex Orbital Observations Near-Earth of Activity of the Sun, or CORONAS, was a Russian Solar observation satellite programme. Three satellites were launched: CORONAS-I, CORONAS-F, and CORONAS-Photon.

== CORONAS-I ==
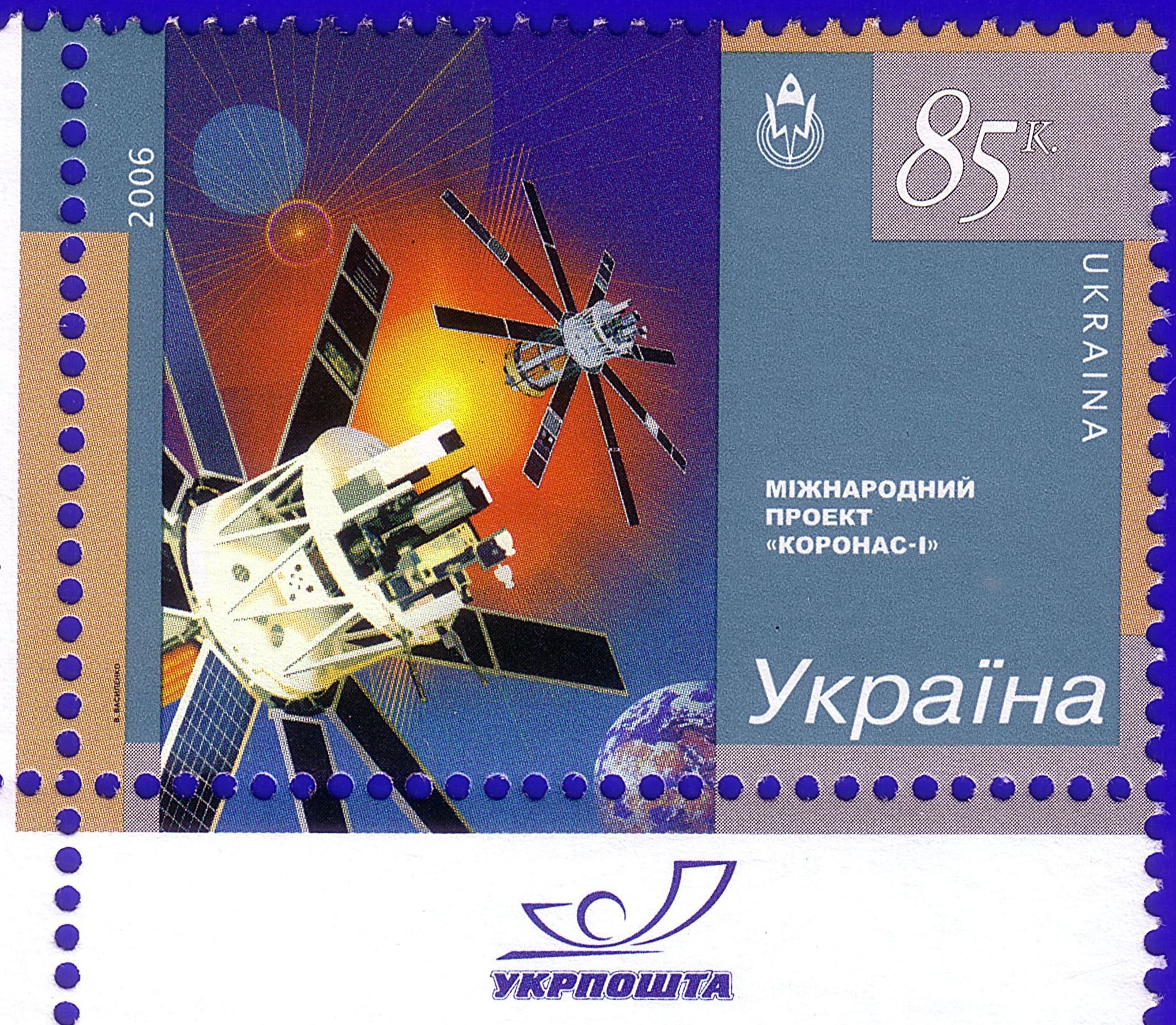
CORONAS-I on a Ukrainian stamp

CORONAS-I was launched in 1994.

The satellites had 12 instrumenents:

- TEREK-C – Solar XUV Telescope/Coronagraph
- RES-C – Solar X-ray Spectral Polarimeter
- DIOGENESS – Diagnostic of Energy Sources and Sinks in Flares
- HELICON – Solar X-ray and gamma-ray Scintillation Spectrometer
- IRIS – Solar Burst Spectrometer
- SUFR-Sp-C – Solar UV Radiometer
- VUSS – Vacuum UV Solar spectrum
- DIFOS – Solar Flux Optical Photometer
- SORS – Solar Radiospectrometer
- SKL-particles – Solar Cosmic-ray Spectrometer Complex – particles
- AVS – Amplitude-time Spectrum Analyser
- SKL-rad – Solar Cosmic-ray Spectrometer Complex – radiation

== CORONAS-F ==
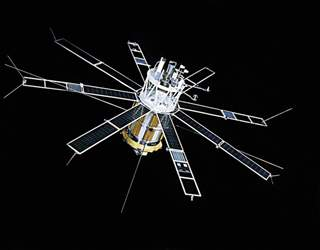
CORONAS-F

CORONAS-I was launched in 2001 and worked until 2005.

The satellites had 16 instrumenents:

- TEREK-C – Solar XUV Telescope/Coronagraph
- RES-C – Solar X-ray Spectral Polarimeter
- DIOGENESS – Diagnostic of Energy Sources and Sinks in Flares
- HELICON – Solar X-ray and gamma-ray Scintillation Spectrometer
- IRIS – Solar Burst Spectrometer
- SUFR-Sp-C – Solar UV Radiometer
- VUSS – Vacuum UV Solar spectrum
- DIFOS – Solar Flux Optical Photometer
- SORS – Solar Radiospectrometer
- SKL-particles – Solar Cosmic-ray Spectrometer Complex – particles
- SPR-N – Solar X-ray Polarimeter
- RESIK – X-ray Spectrometer
- AVS – Amplitude-time Spectrum Analyser
- RPS-1 – X-ray Semi-conductor Spectrometer
- IMAP-5 – Three-axis Magnetometer
- SKL-rad – Solar Cosmic-ray Spectrometer Complex – radiation

== CORONAS-Photon ==
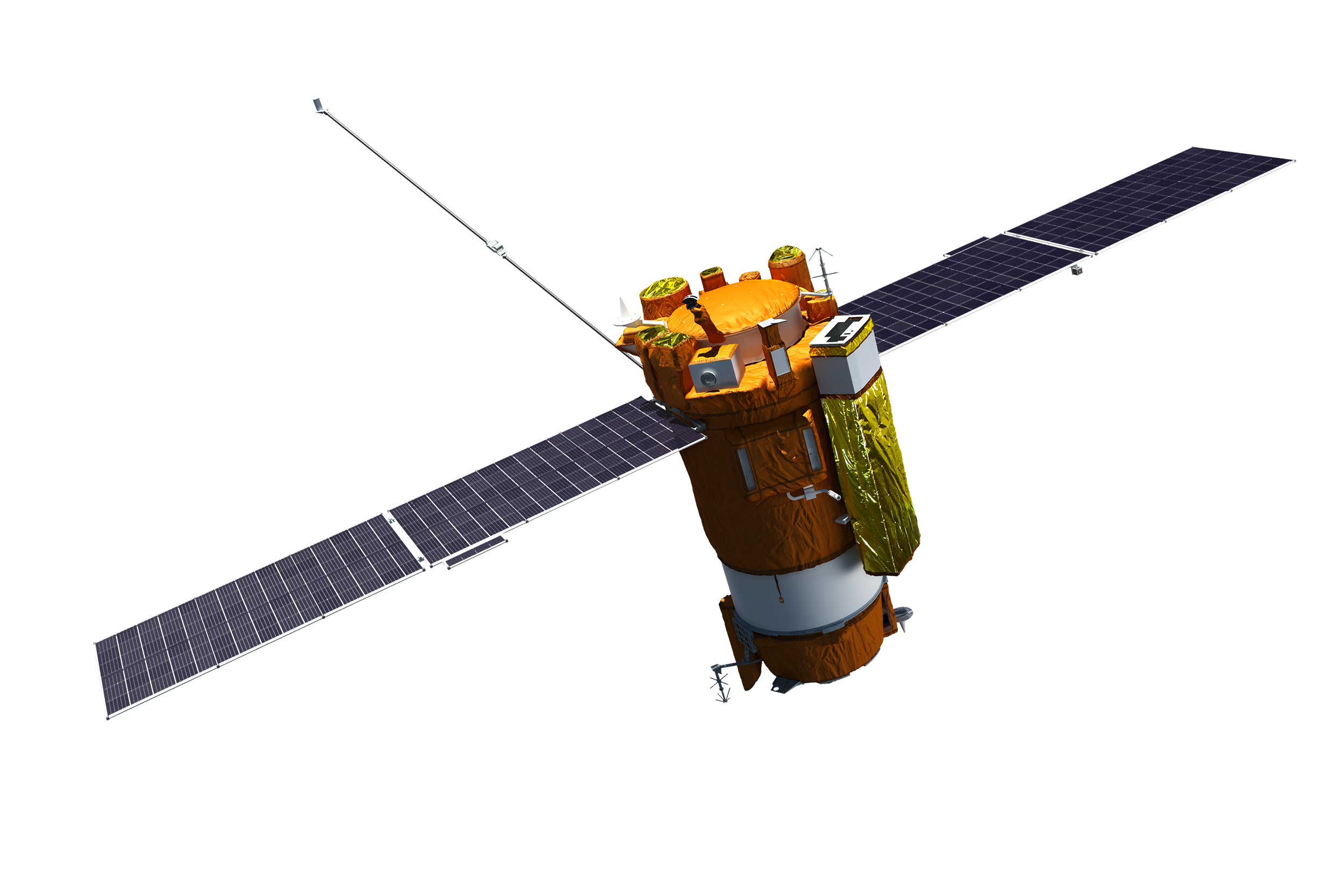
CORONAS-Photon

CORONAS-Photon was launched on 30 January 2009, from Plesetsk Cosmodrome, aboard the final flight of the Tsyklon-3 rocket. On 1 December 2009 all scientific instruments on the satellite were turned off due to the problems with power supply that were caused by a design flaw. On 18 April 2010 the creators of the satellite announced it was lost "with a good deal of certainty".

The satellite had 11 instruments:

- Natalya-2M-rad – High energy radiation spectrometer – radiation
- RT-2 – Roentgen Telescope-2
- Penguin-M – Hard X-ray polarimeter-spectrometer
- Konus-RF – X-ray and gamma-ray spectrometer
- BRM – Fast X-ray Monitor
- PHOKA – Multi-channel ultraviolet monitor
- TESIS – Telescope-spectrometer for imaging solar spectroscopy in X-rays
- Electron-M-PESCA – Charged particle analyzer
- STEP-F – Satellite telescope of electrons and protons
- Natalya-2M-particles – High energy radiation spectrometer – particles
- SM-8M – Magnetometer
