= Prognoz 9 =

Soviet satellite to investigate residual radiation from the Big Bang and gamma flares

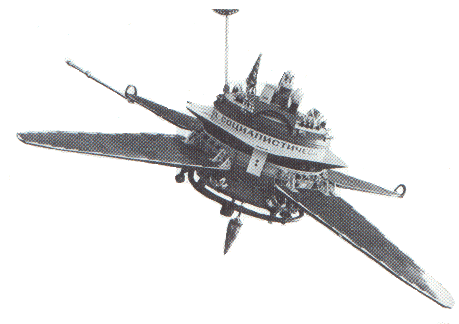
Prognoz spacecraft

Prognoz 9 was a Soviet satellite. It was designed to investigate residual radiation from the Big Bang and gamma-ray bursts in deep space.

== Mission ==
The mission was of Investigation of residual radiation from the Big Bang and gamma-ray bursts in deep space, and solar corpuscular and electromagnetic radiation plasma flows and magnetic fields in circumterrestrial space to determine the effects of solar activity on the interplanetary medium and the Earth's magnetosphere. In addition to the Soviet scientific apparatus, Prognoz 9 carried instruments built in Czechoslovakia and France.

== Launch ==
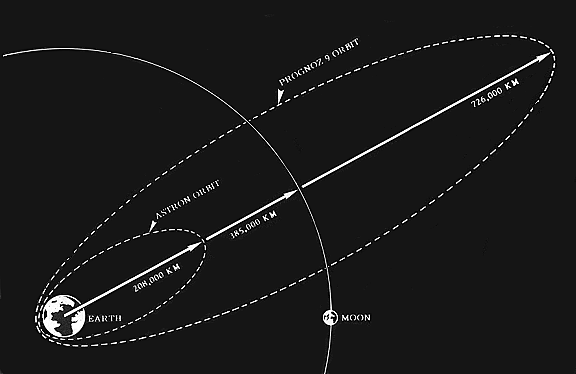
Prognoz 9 orbit

Prognoz 9 was launched from the Baikonur Cosmodrome on 1 July 1983, using a Molniya-M / 8K78M-SOL carrier rocket.

== Specifications ==
- Mass: 1,060 kg (2,340 lb)
- Periapsis: 380 km (240 mi)
- Apoapsis: 720,000 km (450,000 mi)
- Period: 38448.0 min (26.7 days)
- Inclination: 65.5°.

The spacecraft with highly eccentric orbit was spin stabilized with a period of 113 s. The spin axis pointed towards the Sun, and was repointed every few days.

== See also ==
- 1983 in spaceflight
- RELIKT-1
