= Geotail =

NASA/ISAS spacecraft

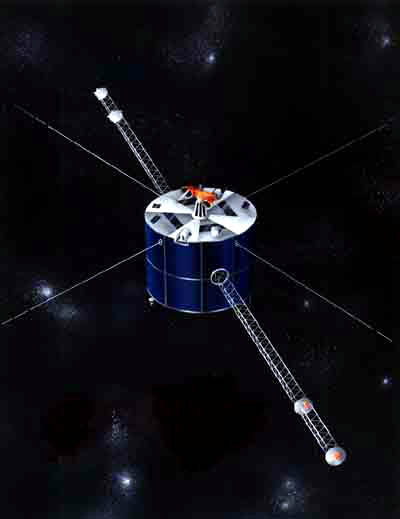
- Geotail satellite (artist's concept)
- Mission type: Earth observation
- Operator: ISAS / NASA
- COSPAR ID: 1992-044A
- SATCAT no.: 22049
- Website: www.stp.isas.jaxa.jp/geotail/
- Mission duration: 30 years, 4 months, 4 days

Spacecraft properties
- Launch mass: 980 kg (2,160 lb)
- Power: 273.0 watts

Start of mission
- Launch date: 24 July 1992, 14:26:00 UTC
- Rocket: Delta II 6925
- Launch site: Cape Canaveral LC-17A

End of mission
- Disposal: Decommissioned
- Deactivated: 28 November 2022

Orbital parameters
- Reference system: Geocentric
- Regime: HEO
- Semi-major axis: 127,367.75 km (79,142.65 mi)
- Eccentricity: 0.5469845
- Perigee altitude: 51,328 km (31,894 mi)
- Apogee altitude: 190,664 km (118,473 mi)
- Inclination: 10.51 degrees
- Period: 7539.86 minutes
- Epoch: 15 January 2015, 13:40:53 UTC

Geotail was a satellite that observed the Earth's magnetosphere. It was developed by Japan's ISAS in association with the United States' NASA, and was launched by a Delta II rocket on 24 July 1992 from Cape Canaveral Air Force Station.

The primary purpose of the mission was to study the structure and dynamics of the tail region of the magnetosphere with a comprehensive set of scientific instruments. For this purpose, the orbit has been designed to cover the magnetotail over a wide range of distances: 8 R_{🜨} to 210 R_{🜨} from the Earth. This orbit also allowed it to study the boundary region of the magnetosphere as it skims the magnetopause at perigees. In the first two years the double lunar swing-by technique was used to keep apogees in the distant magnetotail. This involved 14 lunar flybys.

In 1993 the computer that controls the Low Energy Particles experiment locked up. Attempts to reset it failed. This problem was solved by changing the trajectory of the craft during a lunar flyby that took place on 26 September 1993 so that it passed through the shadow of the Moon. Power from the batteries was cut while this took place. When the craft left the shadow of the Moon, power returned and the computer started working again.

The apogee was lowered down to 50 R_{🜨} in mid November 1994 and then to 30 R_{🜨} in February 1995 in order to study substorm processes in the near-Earth tail region. The present orbit is 9 R_{🜨} × 30 R_{🜨} with an inclination of -7° to the ecliptic plane."

Geotail instruments studied electric fields, magnetic fields, plasmas, energetic particles, and plasma waves.

In 1994 the principal investigator of the Plasma Wave Instrument (PWI), the experiment complement, was Professor Hiroshi Matsumoto of Kyoto University, with co-investigators from NASA, the University of Iowa, and STX Corporation. Geotail, WIND, Polar, SOHO, and Cluster were all part of the International Solar-Terrestrial Physics Science Initiative (ISTP) project.

In June 2022, the second and final of Geotail's two data recorders failed, jeopardizing science observation. It was decided to terminate the operation, and the spacecraft was deactivated on 28 November 2022.

== Discoveries ==
Geotail data has been used to show that flux transfer events move faster than the ambient medium through the Magnetosphere. Those within the Magnetosheath were shown to move both faster and slower than the ambient medium.

During the lunar flybys Geotail identified oxygen, silicon, sodium and aluminium in the lunar atmosphere.

== See also ==
- International Solar-Terrestrial Physics Science Initiative
- Tom Krimigis
