= International Solar-Terrestrial Physics Science Initiative =

The International Solar-Terrestrial Physics Science Initiative (or ISTP for short) is an international research collaboration between NASA, the ESA, and ISAS. Its goal is to study physical phenomena related to the Sun, solar wind and its effects on Earth.

== See also ==
- List of heliophysics missions
