= Madhulika Guhathakurta =

Indian-American astrophysicist and scientist

Mahulika Guhathakarta
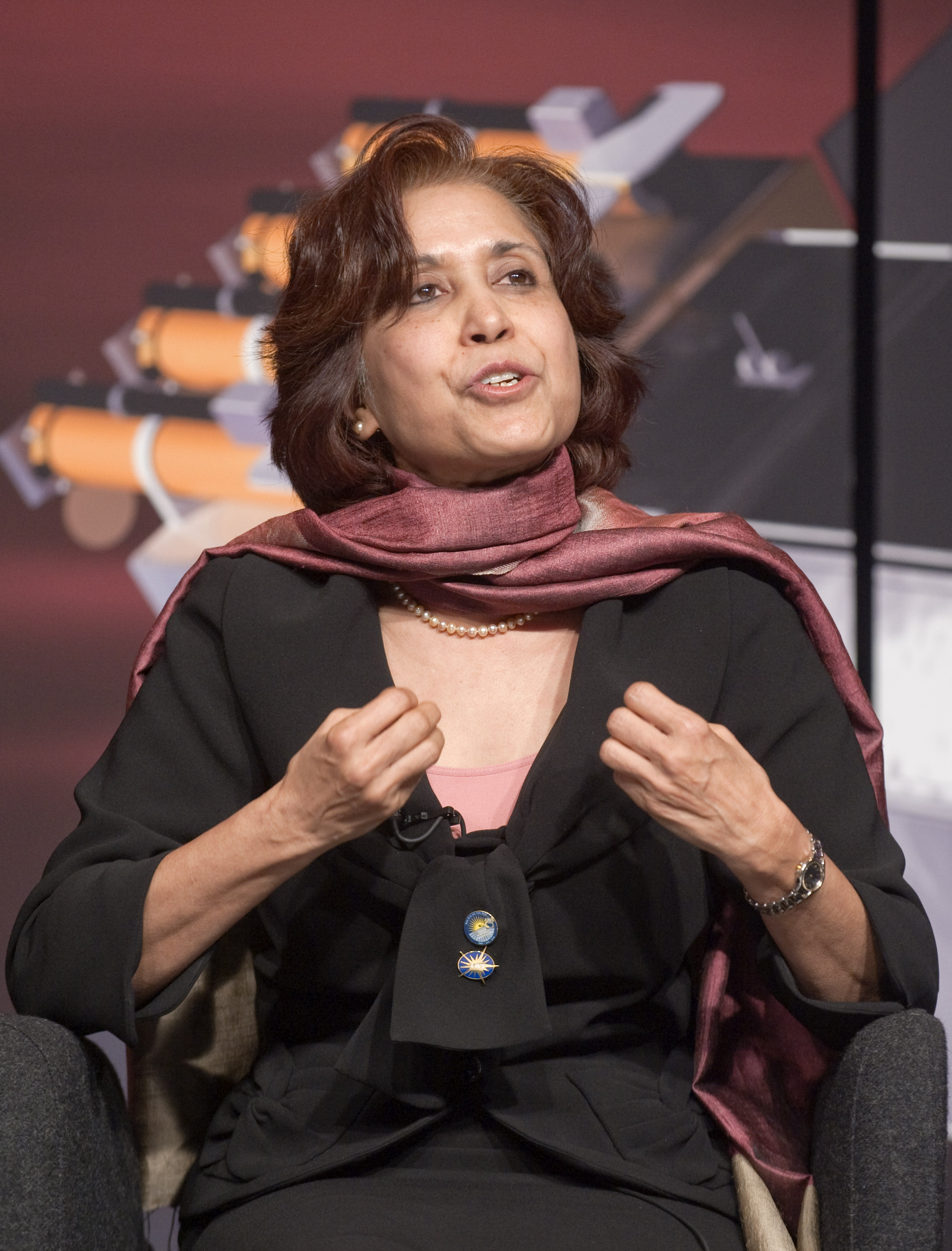
- Born: Kolkata, West Bengal
- Education: University of Delhi (BS, MS); University of Denver (PhD)
- Occupation: Physicist
- Space career

NASA Astrophysicist
- Status: NASA Program Scientist
- Missions: Living With a Star, SDO, STEREO, Van Allen Probes

Madhulika (Lika) Guhathakurta is an Indian astrophysicist and scientist with NASA's Heliophysics Science Division. She was the lead program scientist for NASA's Living With a Star initiative and serves as program scientist on the Solar Dynamics Observatory (SDO), Van Allen Probes, and Solar TErrestrial Relations Observatory (STEREO) missions. Lika was previously the program scientist on SPARTAN-201 (Shuttle Point Autonomous Research Tool for Astronomy-201), a free-flying science instrument platform designed to study velocity and acceleration of the solar wind and observe the Sun's corona. These missions were conducted as part of the larger STS-56, STS-69, STS-77, STS-87, and STS-95 mission objectives. She has worked as an educator, scientist, mission designer, directed and managed science programs, and has built instruments for spacecraft. Dr. Guhathakurta is known for her work in heliophysics where she has authored over 100 publications on the subject. She served as the NASA Lead Scientist for the North American Solar eclipse of August 21, 2017.
