= Solar Sentinels =

Space missions to the Sun proposed in 2006

The Solar Sentinels was a series of proposed space missions to the Sun. Solar Sentinels was proposed in 2006 in conjunction with other Sun missions, and another simpler proposal was submitted in 2008.

It would have studied the Sun during its solar maximum, the last before the beginning of the Orion program. Six spacecraft would have been launched, which would separate into three groups. The Solar Sentinels were proposed to be part of the NASA program Living With a Star.

== Goals ==
The goals of the Solar Sentinels are:

1. Understand the acceleration and transit of solar energetic particles
2. Understand the initiation and evolution of coronal mass ejections (CMEs) and interplanetary shocks in the inner heliosphere

This mission's driving purpose was that the solar maximum of solar cycle 24 would have been the final one before the first upcoming crewed missions to the Moon and Mars. This was the last chance in 11 years to understand the solar storms and the deadly radiation of a solar maximum.

== Spacecraft ==
There would have been six spacecraft: four identical spacecraft which would explore the inner heliosphere, one spacecraft which would take its post near Earth, and the final sentinel to trail slowly behind Earth.

=== Inner Heliospheric Sentinels ===
The majority of the sentinels are the Inner Heliospheric Sentinels (IHS), which would observe the Sun at distances of 0.25 AU. This would be a challenge to scientists and engineers working on these probes, as this is one-fourth the distance between the Earth and the Sun. These probes would make in-situ measurements of energetic particles and plasma. Instruments to measure X-ray, radio, and neutron emissions would be included. Part of the mission concept includes Venus flybys.

=== Near Earth Sentinel ===
The Near Earth Sentinel (NES) would study the solar corona in UV and visible light.

=== Farside Sentinel ===
The Farside Sentinel (FSS) would study the photospheric magnetic field. As three spacecraft are needed to completely monitor this magnetic field, partnerships with two other spacecraft would be made: NASA's Solar Dynamics Observatory and the European Space Agency's Solar Orbiter.

== Launch ==
The three Inner Heliospheric Sentinels would have been launched together. The proposed launch dates were 2014, 2015, or 2017. The nominal mission lasts three years, with an extension to five years if possible.

== Cooperation ==
Several other solar spacecraft would have helped with this mission, such as STEREO, Japan's Hinode, the Solar Dynamics Observatory, and ESA's Solar Orbiter. Ground-based telescopes would also assist the mission. It would have been part of a group of four missions, including the Solar Dynamics Observatory and the Geospace missions (Radiation Belt Storm Probes and Ionosphere-Thermosphere Storm Probes), from the Living With a Star program.
