= Henry Winter (disambiguation) =

Henry Winter (born 1963) is an English sports journalist.

Henry Winter may also refer to:

- Henry Winter (scientist) (born 1972), American scientist
- Henry B. Winter (1883–?), German architect

== See also ==
- Henry Wynter (1885–1943), Australian army officer
