= Heliophysics Science Division =

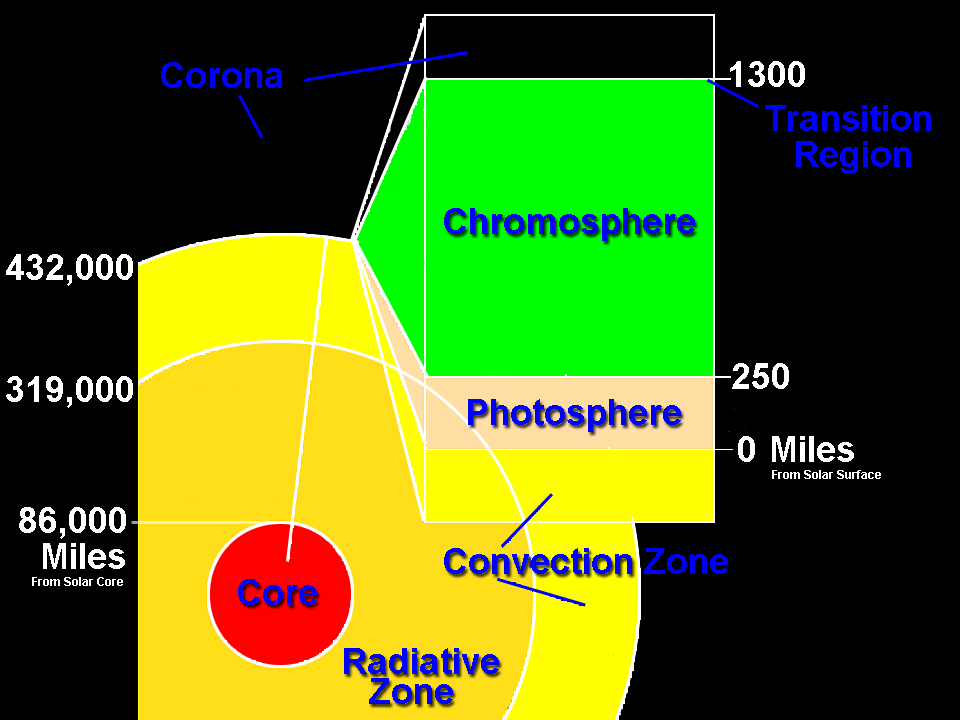
Science of IRIS mission. Understanding the interface between the photosphere and corona remains a fundamental challenge in solar and heliospheric science. Source: NASA Goddard Space Flight Center

The Heliophysics Science Division of the Goddard Space Flight Center (NASA) conducts research on the Sun, its extended Solar System environment (the heliosphere), and interactions of Earth, other planets, small bodies, and interstellar gas with the heliosphere. Division research also encompasses geospace—Earth's uppermost atmosphere, the ionosphere, and the magnetosphere—and the changing environmental conditions throughout the coupled heliosphere (solar system weather).

Scientists in the Heliophysics Science Division develop models, spacecraft missions and instruments, and systems to manage and disseminate heliophysical data. They interpret and evaluate data gathered from instruments, draw comparisons with computer simulations and theoretical models, and publish the results. The Division also conducts education and public outreach programs to communicate the excitement and social value of NASA heliophysics.

== Laboratories ==
Goddard's Heliophysics Science Division consists of four separate laboratories.

=== Solar Physics Laboratory ===
The Solar Physics Laboratory works to understand the Sun as a star and as the primary driver of activity throughout the Solar System. Their research expands knowledge of the Earth-Sun system and helps to enable robotic and human exploration.

=== Heliospheric Physics Laboratory ===
The Heliospheric Physics Laboratory develops instruments and models to investigate the origin and evolution of the solar wind, low-energy cosmic rays, and the interaction of the Sun's heliosphere with the local interstellar medium. The Laboratory designs and implements unique multi-mission and multidisciplinary data services to advance NASA's solar-terrestrial program and our understanding of the Sun-Earth system.

=== Geospace Physics Laboratory ===
The Geospace Physics Laboratory focuses on processes occurring in the magnetospheres of magnetized planets and on the interaction of the solar wind with planetary magnetospheres. Researchers also study processes, such as magnetofluid turbulence, that permeate the heliosphere from the solar atmosphere to the edge of the Solar System.

=== Space Weather Laboratory ===
The Space Weather Laboratory performs research and analysis of the physical processes underlying space weather. It conducts space-based, ground-based, theoretical, and modeling studies of the chain of events that triggers space-weather effects of interest to NASA, other U.S. government agencies, and the general public. Laboratory staff lead the development of space environment projects and missions, and provide project scientists for NASA flight missions with space weather applications. The Laboratory communicates NASA research results to the scientific community, various space weather interests, and the general public. The Space Weather Laboratory also includes the Community Coordinated Modeling Center, which is a multi-agency partnership to enable, support and perform the research and development for next-generation space science and space weather models.

== Notable projects and missions ==
This division of Goddard Space Flight Center has interests in various projects and missions. In addition to performing research based on NASA solar observatories in space, the division manages many heliophysics missions on behalf of the Science Mission Directorate at NASA headquarters. These include:

=== Advanced Composition Explorer ===
The Advanced Composition Explorer (ACE) observes and measures the composition of particles from the solar wind as well as galactic cosmic rays. Its prime objective is to improve measurements of the composition of diverse samples of matter associated with the Sun, the interstellar medium, and the galaxy surrounding us. ACE is capable of providing near-real-time solar wind and magnetic field information that aids in forecasting space weather. Advance knowledge of solar wind disturbances heading toward Earth – of about half an hour – can help mitigate the effects of geomagnetic storms that can overload power grids and disrupt communications on Earth.

=== ARTEMIS ===
The ARTEMIS, or Acceleration, Reconnection, Turbulence and Electrodynamics of the Moon's Interaction with the Sun, mission studies the Moon's space environment, surface composition and magnetic field, and core structure. ARTEMIS uses two spacecraft from the THEMIS magnetosphere mission that were moved into place near the Moon.

=== BARREL ===
This division is also involved in the Balloon Array for Radiation-belt Relativistic Electron Losses (BARREL) study. Twenty balloons were launched during a January 2013 campaign in Antarctica to study a space weather phenomenon, during which electrons stream down toward the poles from the two Van Allen Belts, which surround Earth. It is a NASA-funded mission.

=== CINDI ===
The Coupled Ion-Neutral Dynamics Investigations (CINDI) is a project to understand the dynamics of Earth's ionosphere. CINDI provides two instruments for the Communication/Navigation Outage Forecast System (C/NOFS) satellite, which is a United States Air Force project. CINDI helps predict the behavior of equatorial ionospheric irregularities, which can cause major problems for communications and navigation systems.

=== Cluster ===
Cluster is a joint ESA/NASA mission that provides in-situ investigation of plasma processes in Earth's magnetosphere using four identical spacecraft. The four spacecraft make it possible to better observe three-dimensional and time-varying phenomena, as well as to distinguish between the two as it moves through space in its orbit around Earth.

=== EZIE ===
The Electrojet Zeeman Imaging Explorer (EZIE) is aimed at studying how the electric currents in the Earth's atmosphere, linking the aurora to the Earth's magnetosphere. It was launched in March 2025.

=== Geotail ===
Geotail is a joint JAXA/NASA mission. Its primary objective is to study the dynamics of the entire length of Earth's magnetotail, from the near-Earth region to the distant tail.

=== Interface Region Imaging Spectrograph ===
Engaging in solar and heliospheric science, the Interface Region Imaging Spectrograph (IRIS) mission is intended to study of the solar atmosphere, and in particular, of the interface between the photosphere and corona. The IRIS mission will accomplish this by tracing the flow of energy and plasma through the chromosphere and transition region into the corona using spectrometry and imaging. IRIS is designed to provide significant new information to increase the understanding of energy transport into the corona and solar wind and provide an archetype for all stellar atmospheres. The unique instrument capabilities, coupled with state of the art 3-D modeling, will fill a large gap in the knowledge of this dynamic region of the solar atmosphere. The mission will extend the scientific output of existing heliophysics spacecraft that follow the effects of energy release processes from the Sun to Earth. The IRIS mission launched June 27, 2013.

=== Interstellar Boundary Explorer ===
The Interstellar Boundary Explorer, or IBEX, images the outer boundaries of the heliosphere, focusing on how the solar wind interacts with the interstellar medium and its magnetic fields at the very edges of the Solar System. IBEX maps the region by measuring the energetic neutral atoms that are created near the boundary, creating a new map every six months. After completing and analyzing the first maps, IBEX now monitors changes that correspond to variations in solar activity.

=== Reuven Ramaty High Energy Solar Spectroscopic Imager ===
The Reuven Ramaty High Energy Solar Spectroscopic Imager (RHESSI) combines high-resolution imaging in hard X-rays and gamma rays with high-resolution spectroscopy to explore the basic physics of particle acceleration and energy release in solar flares. This information extends understanding of the fundamental processes that are involved in generating solar flares and coronal mass ejections. These super-energetic solar eruptive events are the most extreme drivers of space weather and present danger in space and on Earth.

=== Solar-C EUVST Mission ===
Solar-C is a joint NASA/JAXA mission, along with other international partners, targeted for launch in July 2028. The Extreme Ultraviolet High-Throughput Spectroscopic Telescope (EUVST) will study how the solar atmosphere releases solar wind and propagates eruptions of solar material, and its influence on the radiation throughout the solar system.

=== Solar Dynamics Observatory ===
NASA's Solar Dynamics Observatory (SDO) mission was launched in 2010 and is currently studying solar activity and how it causes space weather. Space weather affects not only our lives on Earth, but Earth itself, and everything outside its atmosphere (astronauts and satellites out in space and even the other planets). SDO is helping us understand where the Sun's energy comes from, how the inside of the Sun works, and how energy is stored and released in the Sun's atmosphere. By better understanding the Sun and how it works, we will be able to better predict and better forecast space weather events.

=== Solar and Heliospheric Observatory ===
A joint ESA/NASA mission, the Solar and Heliospheric Observatory (SOHO) studies the sun, from deep inside its core to the outer corona and solar wind. SOHO has been capturing images of the dynamic flares and coronal mass ejections on the Sun since 1996. The mission has provided an unprecedented breadth and depth of information about the Sun, with instruments that study its interior through the hot and dynamic atmosphere to the solar wind and its interaction with the interstellar medium. Its coronagraphs remain a key component for forecasting the speed, direction and strength of coronal mass ejections as they erupt from the Sun. In addition to watching the Sun, SOHO has become a prolific discoverer of comets in astronomical history: as of 2012, over 2000 comets have been found by SOHO.

=== STEREO ===
The Solar Terrestrial Relations Observatory (STEREO) mission employs two nearly identical space-based observatories to provide the stereoscopic measurements to study the sun. With a pair of viewpoints, scientists are able to see the structure and evolution of solar storms as they blast from the Sun and travel out through space. STEREO's instruments provide a unique combination of observations to help understand the causes and mechanisms of coronal mass ejections and to characterize how they propagate through the Solar System. STEREO also helps determine what powers the acceleration of energetic particles from the Sun and provides information on the structure of the solar wind.

=== THEMIS ===
THEMIS answers fundamental questions concerning a type of space weather called a substorm that can abruptly and explosively release solar wind energy stored within Earth's magnetotail. Substorms cause auroras at high latitudes, and THEMIS seeks to understand this process. Originally five spacecraft, THEMIS now consists of three, as two were repurposed to study the Moon in the ARTEMIS mission. The mission also relies on a dedicated array of ground observatories located in Canada and the northern United States.

=== TIMED ===
The Thermosphere Ionosphere Mesosphere Energetics and Dynamics, or TIMED, mission explores Earth's mesosphere and lower thermosphere (40–50 miles up), the least explored and understood region of the atmosphere. Solar events, as well as temperature changes in the stratosphere can perturb this region, but the overall structure of and responses to these effects are not understood. Advances in remote sensing technology employed by TIMED enable it to explore this region on a global basis from space.

=== TWINS ===
The instruments on the Two Wide-Angle Imaging Neutral-Atom Spectrometers, or TWINS, provide stereo imaging of Earth's magnetosphere—the region surrounding the planet, controlled by Earth's magnetic field and containing the Van Allen radiation belts and other energetic charged particles. TWINS enables three-dimensional global visualization of this region, leading to greatly enhanced understanding of the connections between different areas of the magnetosphere and their relation to the solar wind.

=== IMAP ===
IMAP (Interstellar Mapping and Acceleration Probe) is a heliosphere observation mission. Launched in September 2025, it will sample, analyze, and map particles streaming to Earth from the edges of interstellar space.

=== Van Allen Probes ===
The Van Allen Probes consist of twin spacecraft studying the extreme and dynamic regions of space known as the Van Allen Radiation Belts that surround Earth. The radiation belts intensify or weaken over time as part of the much larger space weather system driven by the energy and material that erupt off the Sun's surface and fill the entire Solar System.

=== Voyager mission ===
The Voyager missions (Voyager 1 and Voyager 2) are a part of NASA's Heliophysics System Observatory, sponsored by the Heliophysics Division of the Science Mission Directorate at NASA Headquarters in Washington. The Voyager spacecraft were built and continue to be operated by NASA's Jet Propulsion Laboratory, in Pasadena, Calif. On December 4, 2012, eleven billion miles from Earth, NASA's Voyager 1 spacecraft has entered a "magnetic highway" that connects the Solar System to interstellar space. The "magnetic highway" is a place in the far reaches of the Solar System where the Sun's magnetic field connects to the magnetic field of interstellar space. In this region, the Sun's magnetic field lines are connected to interstellar magnetic field lines, allowing particles from inside the heliosphere to zip away and particles from interstellar space to zoom in. In recent years, the speed of the solar wind around Voyager 1 has slowed to zero, and the intensity of the magnetic field has increased.

=== Additional Projects ===
The Space Physics Data Facility (SPDF) is a project of the Heliospheric Science Division (HSD) at NASA's Goddard Space Flight Center. SPDF consists of web-based services for survey and high resolution data and trajectories. The Facility supports data from most NASA Heliophysics missions to promote correlative and collaborative research across discipline and mission boundaries.
