= Magnetograph =

Magnetograph may refer to:

- Solar magnetograph, an instrument that produces solar magnetograms
- Survey magnetograph, a survey magnetometer that continuously records the time-variation in the geomagnetic field
