= Ionosphere-Thermosphere Storm Probes =

- Mission type: Two Earth orbiters investigating the ionosphere and thermosphere
- Operator: NASA

Orbital parameters
- Reference system: Geocentric
- Inclination: 60°

The Ionosphere-Thermosphere Storm Probes (I-TSP) is a NASA mission which will study the ionosphere and the thermosphere. This mission is part of the Living With a Star program, the second mission in a pair of geospace missions. The first mission is the Radiation Belt Storm Probes, which were launched in August 2012.

== Mission ==
Like the Radiation Belt Storm Probes, the I-TSP will be a twin spacecraft mission. The mission is to study distributions of ionospheric and thermospheric densities, geomagnetic disturbances, and ionospheric irregularities. This mission relates to the Sun and solar storms in that it studies the effects of solar storms on geospace. This mission can save astronauts and satellites.

== Goals ==
The Ionosphere-Thermosphere Storm Probes mission has two goals:

1. Determine the effects of solar variability on the global-scale behavior of ionospheric electron density
2. Determine the solar and geospace causes of small scale ionospheric irregularities

== See also ==
- Ionosphere
- Radiation Belt Storm Probes
- Living With a Star
- Thermosphere
