= Henry Winter (scientist) =

American solar physicist

Henry "Trae" Winter III
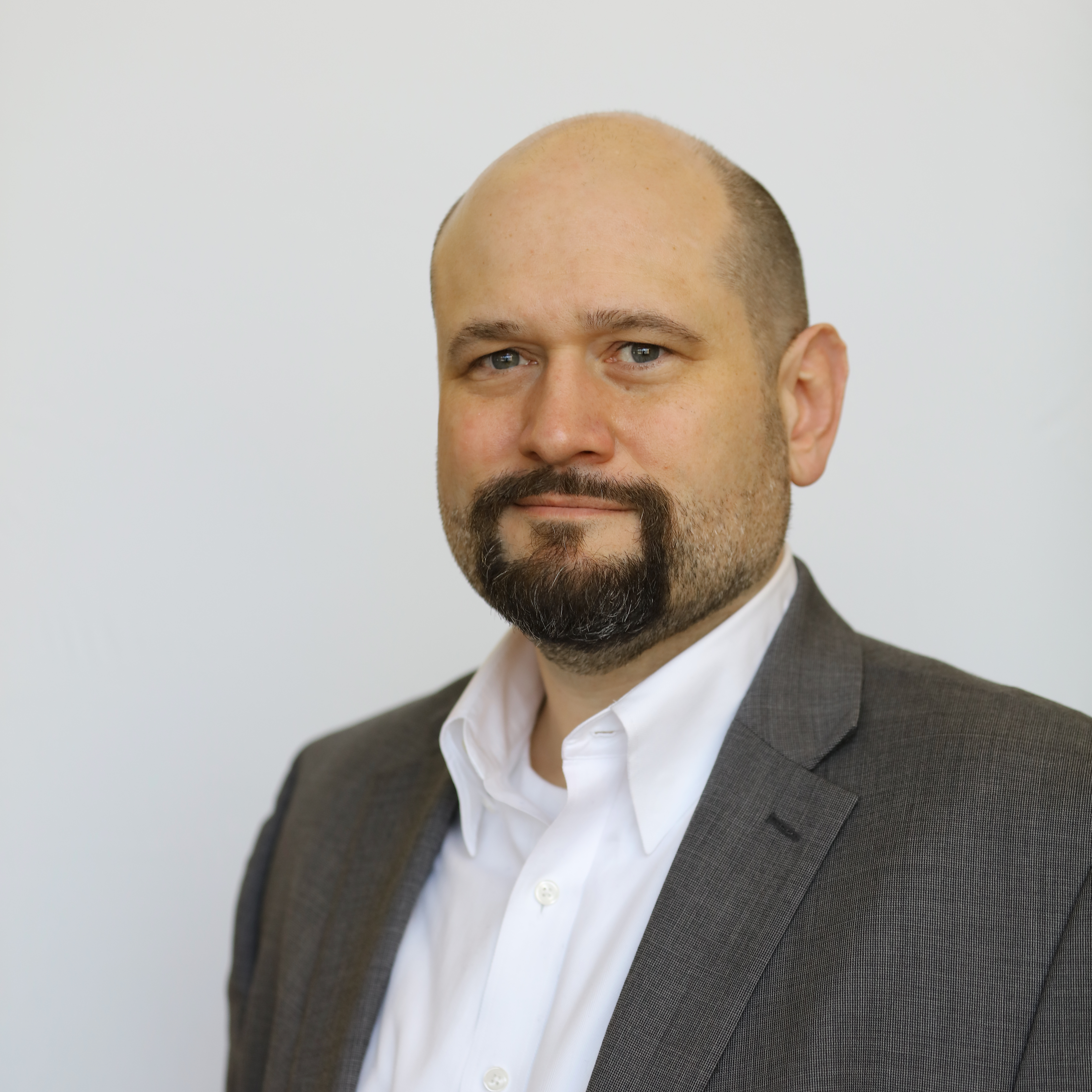
- Henry Winter
- Born: March 31, 1972 (age 54); Memphis, TN
- Other names: Trae, Tracy
- Education: University of Memphis (B.S.), University of Memphis (M.S.), Montana State University, Bozeman (Ph.D.)
- Occupation: Astrophysicist
- Known for: Solar Physicist, Museum Exhibits, Astronomy Apps for people who are blind or visually impaired.

Henry "Trae" Winter (born March 31, 1972) is an American solar physicist currently employed by the Smithsonian Astrophysical Observatory. He has carried out data analysis for the Solar and Heliospheric Observatory, Yohkoh, Hinode, SDO, and TRACE spacecraft, but is especially noted for his extensive science education and outreach activities. Outreach activity includes development of several museum exhibits in the Boston area, and of the "Solar Wall" exhibition at the Smithsonian Air and Space Museum in Washington, D.C.
