= Rbsp =

RBSP may refer to:

- Radiation Belt Storm Probes, a NASA mission studying the effects of solar activity on relativistic ions and electrons
- Raw byte sequence payload, a syntax structure for the H.264/MPEG-4 AVC video compression standard
