= Vector magnetograph =

A vector magnetograph is a type of imaging telescope that can estimate the 3-D vector of the magnetic field on a distant body with a resolved line spectrum. Magnetographs are useful for studying the Sun because the surface magnetic field is important to the creation and maintenance of the solar corona, and gives rise to the phenomena of solar flares and space weather.

Vector magnetographs measure the longitudinal (line-of-sight) component of the magnetic field separately from the transverse (image-plane) components, using different aspects of the Zeeman splitting that affects the wavelength of emission and/or absorption spectral lines in the presence of a magnetic field. The Zeeman splitting is caused by the fact that individual atoms are magnetized due to the circulating motion of electrons bound to them. Emission or absorption of a photon changes the magnetic moment of the atom. In a magnetic field, photons emitted with different polarizations gain or lose energy depending on their orientation relative to the surrounding magnetic field, changing the characteristics of the spectral line—some polarization components are blue-shifted or red-shifted relative to the line's reference wavelength, by a factor proportional to the field intensity.

Specifically, the circular-polarized component of the light is shifted in wavelength proportional to the field strength in the direction of the observer, and the wavelength shift of the vertical and horizontal linearly-polarized components measures the field strength in those directions.

A vector magnetograph works in a very narrow waveband around a single spectral line, for example the 525.02 nm 'Fe I' line from neutral (non-ionized) iron. The measured shifts in wavelength are fractions of a picometre. Measuring the full spectral profile of the line with this precision requires a high-dispersion spectrograph and a long time to collect sufficient photons to make the measurement with precision. For example, SOLIS requires about an hour to gather polarized spectral profiles over the whole Sun, and Hinode, the recently launched spacecraft with a 0.5-meter solar telescope on board, takes about an hour to cover a 164-arcsecond-square field (1% of the Sun) at very high spatial resolution. Other types of magnetograph use narrowband filter imaging to produce a measurement of the first few moments of the spectral line, and operate much more quickly: the HMI instrument on board the Solar Dynamics Observatory will produce a vector magnetogram every few minutes.

The splitting effect is antisymmetric along the line-of-sight, but symmetric transverse to the line of sight, so the transverse component of the field can only be measured up to a factor of -1: there is a 180° ambiguity in vector magnetograph measurements of portion of the magnetic field that is perpendicular to the line of sight of the instrument.

Notable existing vector magnetographs include the IVM at the Mees Observatory in Hawaii, SVM at Udaipur Solar Observatory, India, the SOLIS instrument at the National Solar Observatory (strictly speaking, SOLIS is a scanned spectropolarimeter), and the narrowband filtergraph instrument on the Hinode spacecraft. Planned instruments include a vector polarimeter at the Advanced Technology Solar Telescope slated to be built in the 20-teens, and the HMI instrument aboard the Solar Dynamics Observatory, launched in February 2010.
