= BARREL =

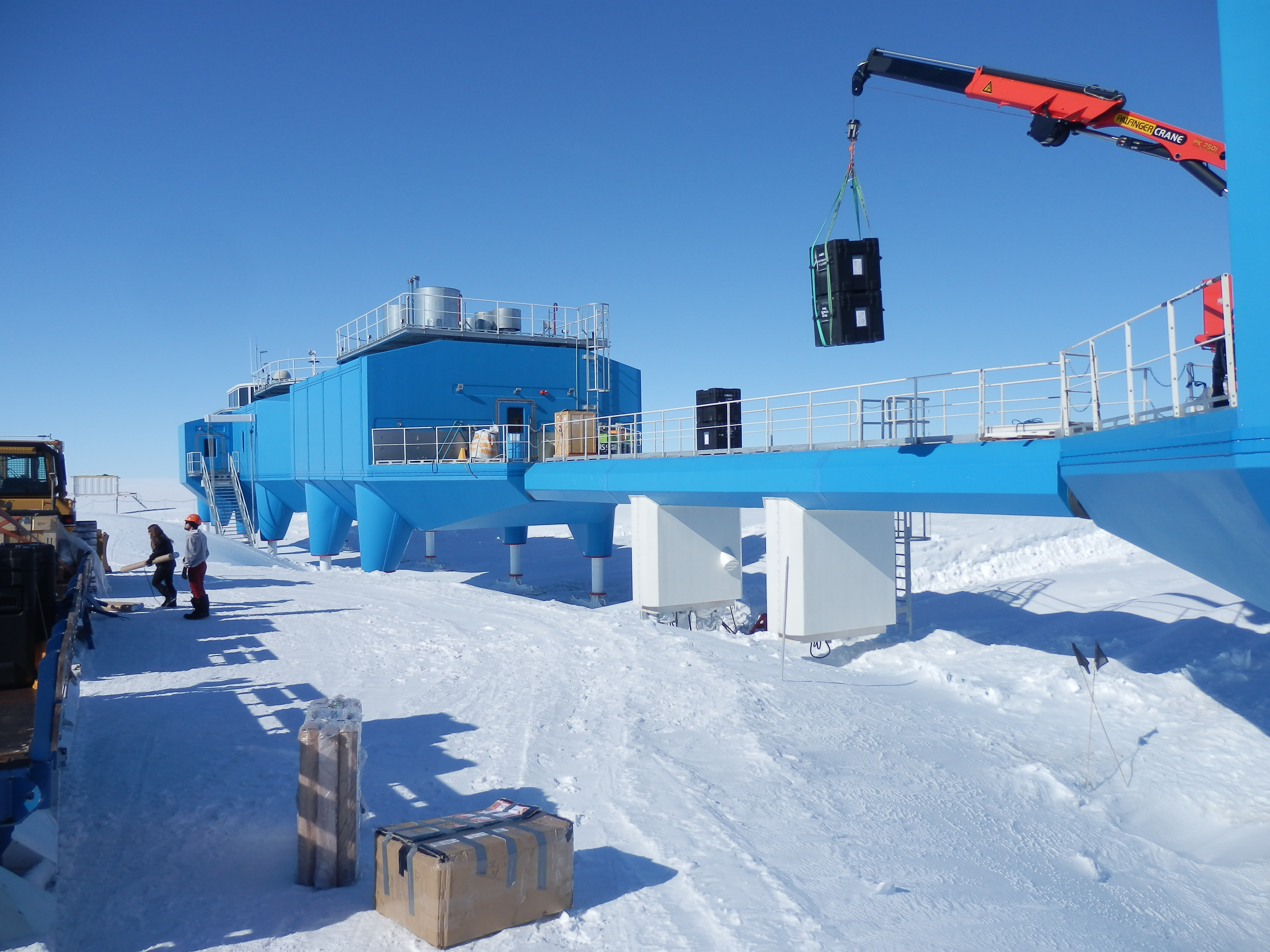
A crane lowers two BARREL balloon payloads onto the platform at Halley Research Station in Antarctica

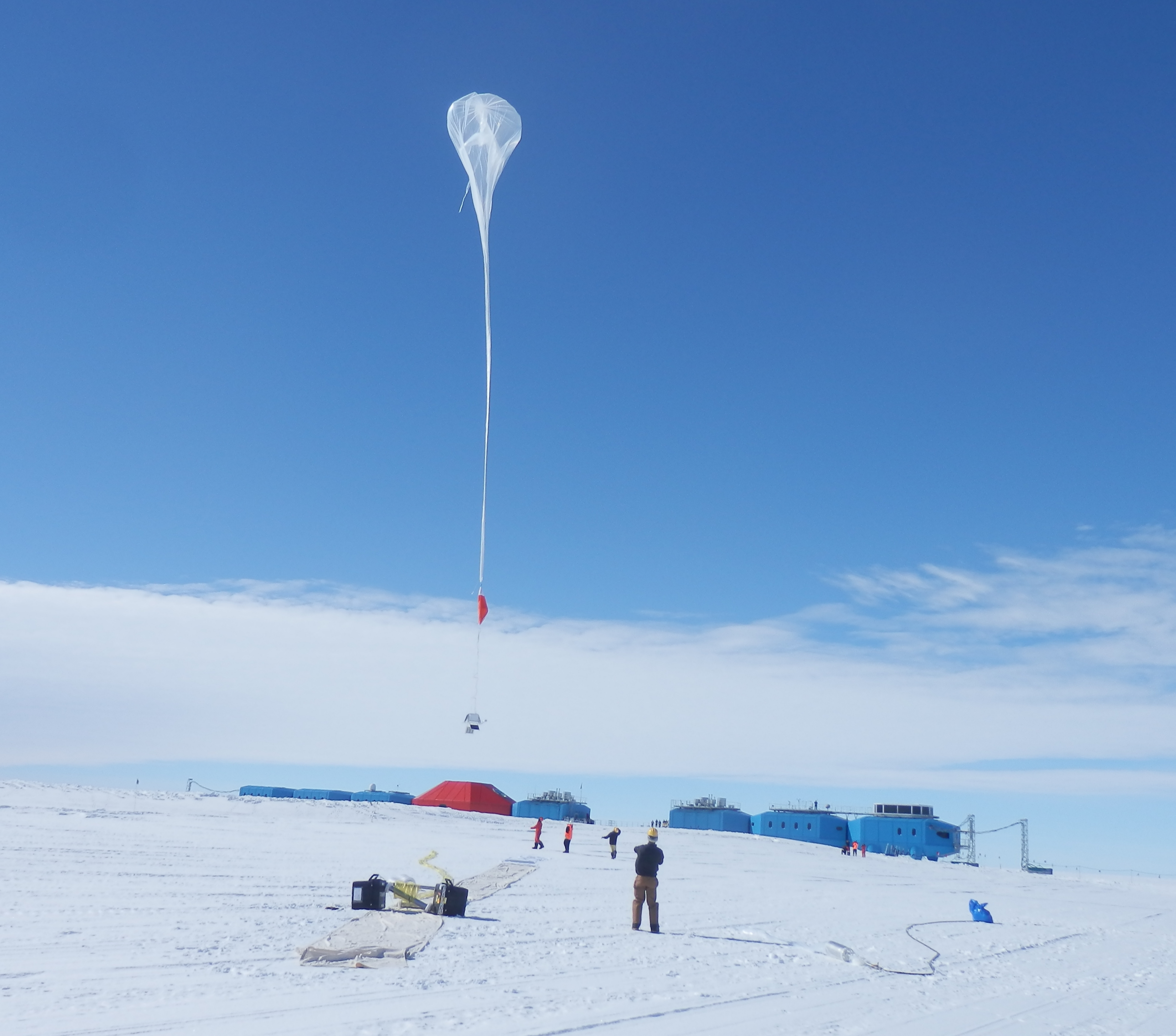
A balloon begins to rise over the brand new Halley VI Research Station, which had its grand opening in February 2013

Balloon Array for Radiation-belt Relativistic Electron Losses (BARREL, sometimes called Balloon Array for RBSP Relativistic Electron Losses) was a NASA mission operated out of Dartmouth College that worked with the Van Allen Probes mission (formerly known as the Radiation Belt Storm Probes, or RBSP, mission). The BARREL project launched a series of high-altitude balloons during four science campaigns: January–February 2013 in Antarctica, December 2013–February 2014 in Antarctica, August 2015 in Sweden, and August 2016 in Sweden. Unlike the football-field-sized balloons typically launched at the Poles, these were each just 27 meters (90 ft) in diameter.

The last balloon was launched August 30, 2016. During the BARREL program, a total of 45 balloon payloads were built, and eight test flights and 55 science flights were carried out.

== Scientific objectives ==
BARREL helped study the Van Allen radiation belts and why they wax and wane over time. Each BARREL balloon carried instruments to measure particles ejected from the belts which make it down to Earth's atmosphere. By comparing such data to that of the Van Allen Probes, which orbit with the belts themselves, the two missions attempted to correlate observations in the radiation belts with the number of particles ejected. This was done to help distinguish between various theories as to what causes electron loss in the belts.

== Organization ==
The principal investigator was Robyn Millan at Dartmouth College. Co-investigator institutions were the University of Washington, U. C. Berkeley, and U. C. Santa Cruz. BARREL was part of NASA's Living With a Star program. Support for the Antarctica balloon campaigns was provided by the National Science Foundation, British Antarctic Survey, and the South African National Antarctic Programme.
