= Living With a Star =

NASA scientific research program

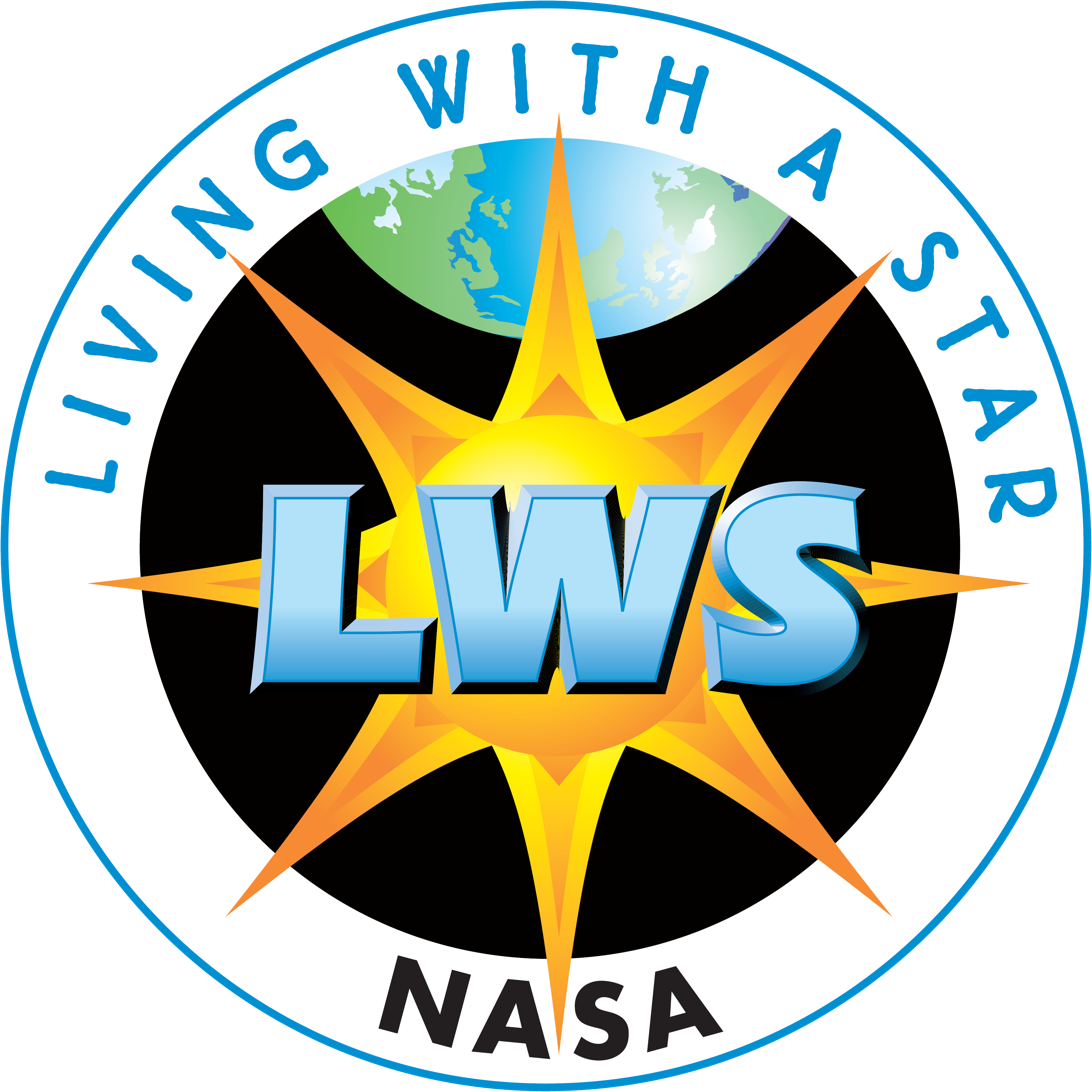
Living With a Star program logo

Living With a Star (LWS) is a NASA scientific program to study those aspects of the connected Sun-Earth system that directly affect life and society. LWS is a crosscutting initiative with goals and objectives relevant to NASA's Exploration Initiative, as well as to NASA's Strategic Enterprises. The program is managed by the Heliophysics Science Division of NASA's Science Mission Directorate.

LWS is composed of three major components: scientific investigations on spaceflight platforms study different regions of the Sun, interplanetary space, and geospace; an applied science Space Environment Testbeds program where protocols and components are tested; and a Targeted Research and Technology Program. Major spacecraft include the Van Allen Probes, Solar Dynamics Observatory, and the Parker Solar Probe.

== History ==
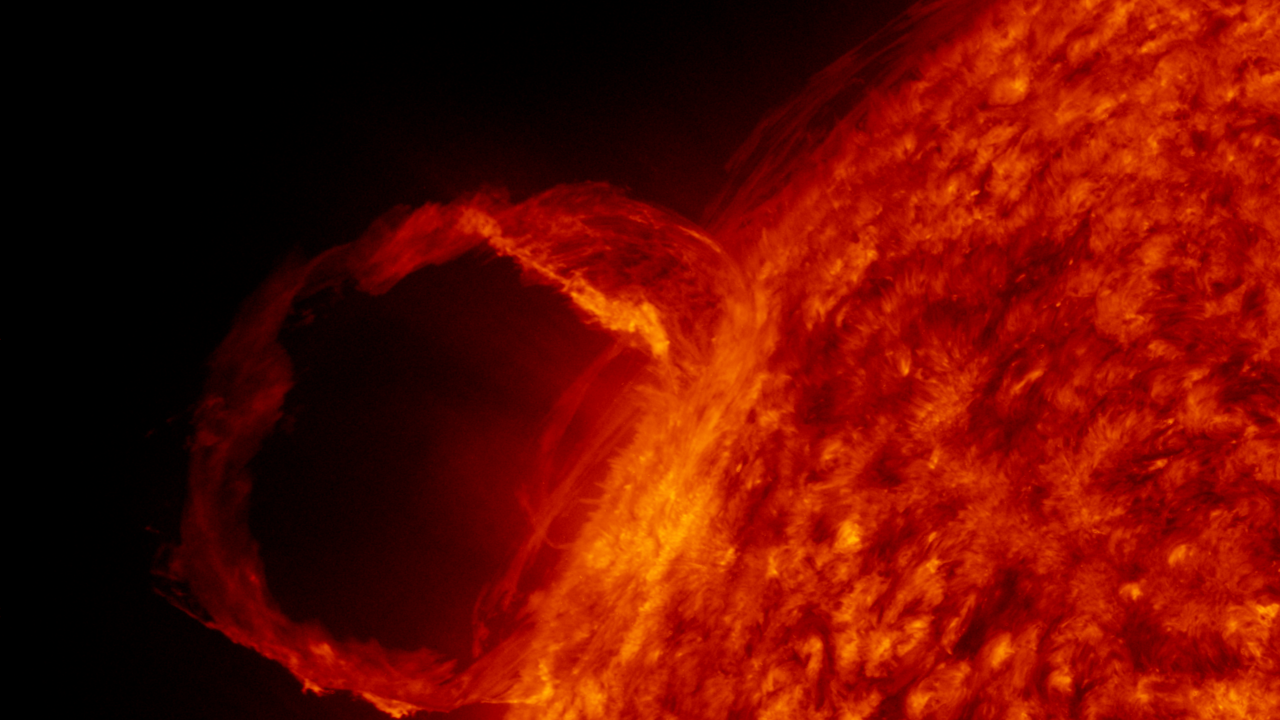
Solar prominence as recorded by the Solar Dynamics Observatory

Living With a Star was proposed in 2000 and established with funding in the fall of 2001. An international collaboration was additionally sought, known as the International Living With a Star program, conducted through the Interagency Consultative Group (IACG). After the dedicated IACG "Task Group" concluded meetings with its recommendation, ILWS was formed in 2002.

LWS also maintains the Targeted Research & Technology program.

Areas of study for LWS include:

- The Sun
- Space weather
- Explorers Program
- Magnetosphere
- Heliosphere
- Living with a Star
- Solar eclipses

=== Objectives ===
The program is focused on understanding the relationship between the Sun and the Earth across several disciplines and areas of study:

- Space Science
- Earth Science
- Human Exploration and Development
- Aeronautics and Space Transportation

== Missions ==
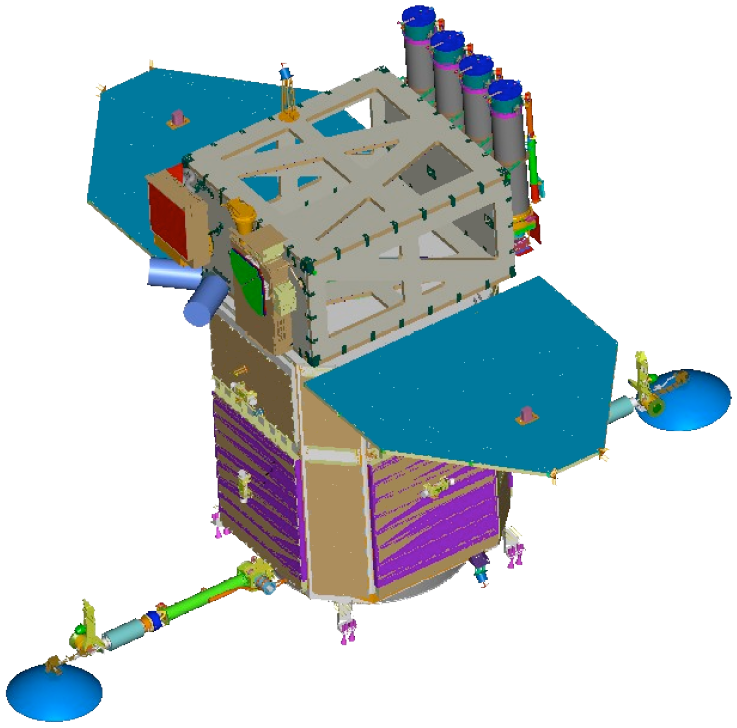
Solar Dynamics Observatory spacecraft

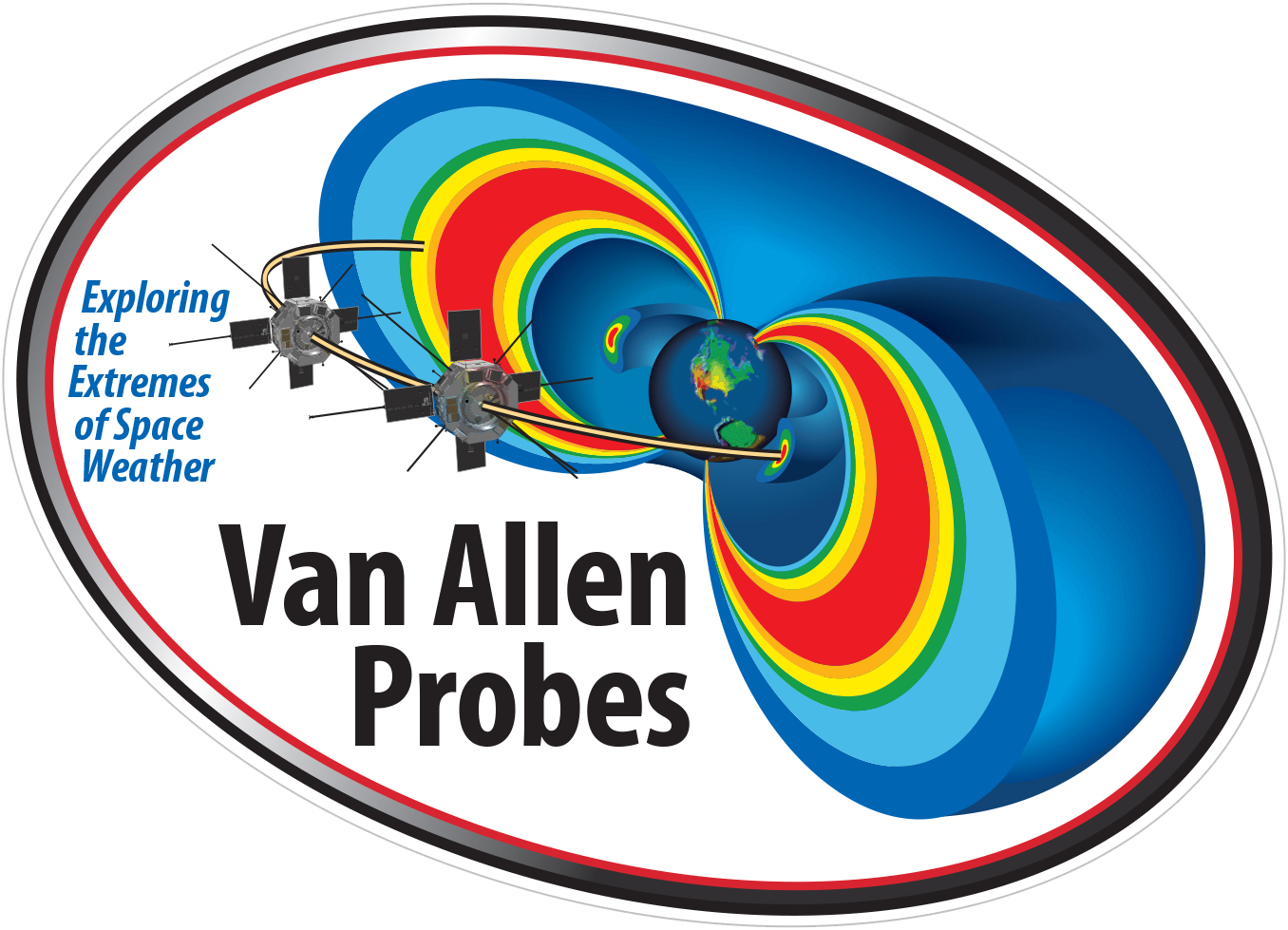
Van Allen Probes logo

There are currently three active spacecraft dedicated to this program: the Solar Dynamics Observatory launched in 2010, Parker Solar Probe in 2018, and the Solar Orbiter collaboration with the European Space Agency launched in 2020. The twin Van Allen Probes spacecraft were deactivated in 2019 after more than seven years of operation. In December 2012 through January 2013 and December 2013 through January 2014, the Balloon Array for Radiation-belt Relativistic Electron Losses (BARREL) mission was also conducted under this program.

Science requirements and conceptual mission implementation have been defined for the Geospace Dynamics Coupling (GDC) spacecraft constellation, the formerly proposed Solar Sentinels, as well as other future missions under development or consideration.

== Space Environment Testbeds ==
SET uses existing data and new data from low-cost missions to achieve the following: Define the mechanisms for induced space environment and effects; reduce uncertainties in the definitions of the induced environment and effects on spacecraft and their payloads; and to improve design and operations guidelines and test protocols so that spacecraft anomalies and failures due to environmental effects during operations are reduced.

The goal of this mission is to understand the nature of the environment of space and how that environment impacts spacecraft.

== Targeted Research and Technology ==
With the 2001 inception of the LWS Program, new opportunities were created for a systematic, goal-oriented research program targeting those aspects of the Sun-Earth system that affect life and society. To provide immediate progress toward achieving the LWS goals, the Targeted Research and Technology (TR&T) component of the program was developed. The TR&T element has solicited five rounds of proposals seeking quantitative understanding and predictive capability throughout the system. TR&T has funded independent research awards, focused science topic panels, and strategic capability challenges to enable a cross-disciplinary, integrated, system-wide understanding of how the Sun varies, and how Earth and planets respond. The focused science topic panels are a novel approach to collaborative science, and initial results appear promising.

== Missions ==
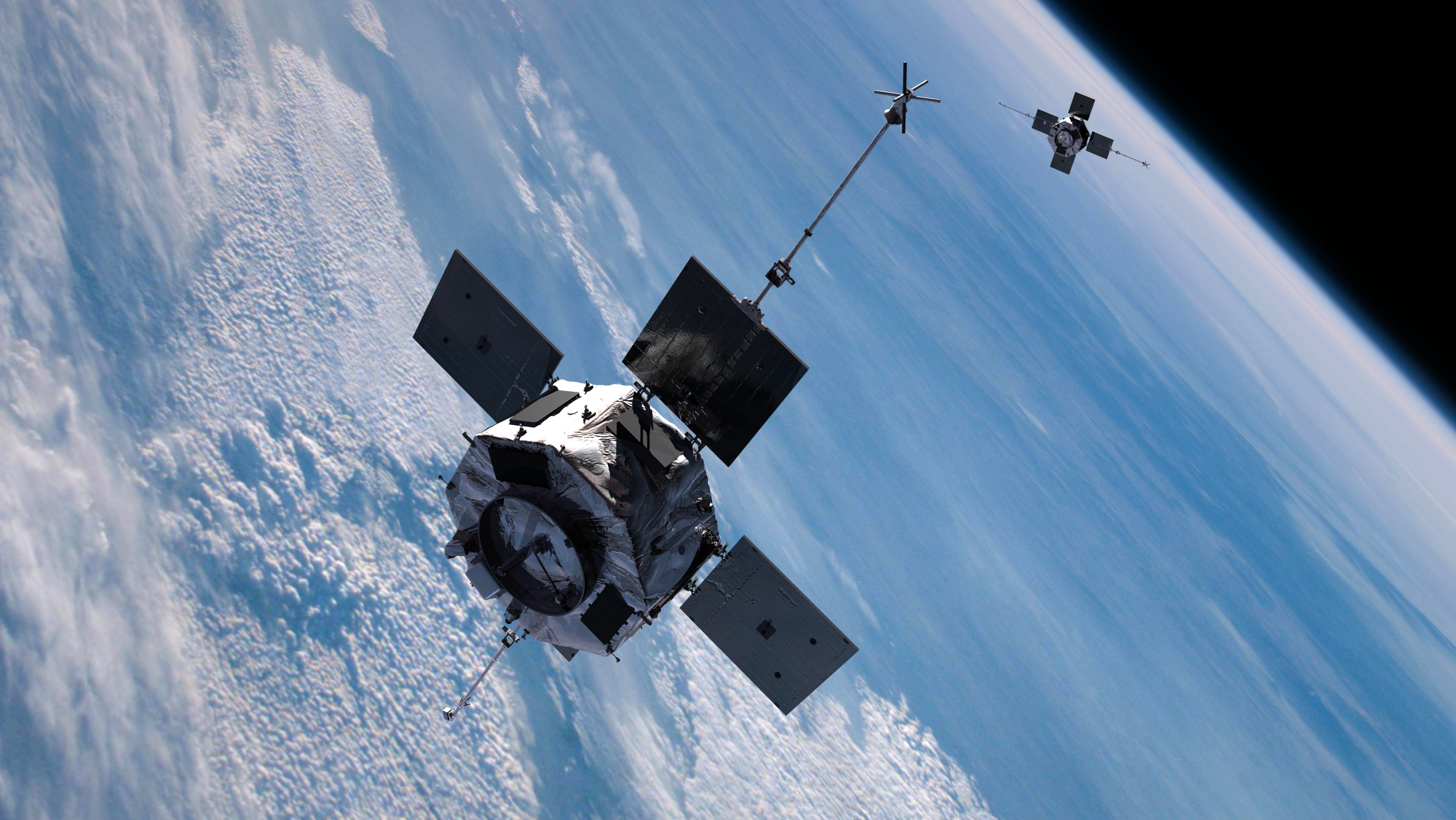
illustration of the twin Van Allen Probes deploying in Earth Orbit

The following missions are associated with the Living With a Star program, with launch dates indicated.

- February 2010 – Solar Dynamics Observatory (SDO)
- August 2012 – Van Allen Probes
- December 2012/January 2013 and December 2013/January 2014 – Balloon Array for Radiation-belt Relativistic Electron Losses (BARREL)
- August 2018 – Parker Solar Probe
- June 2019 – Space Environment Testbeds (SET)
- February 2020 – Solar Orbiter (SolO)

== See also ==
- List of heliophysics missions
- List of NASA missions
