= Robyn Millan =

American experimental physicist

- Education: University of California, Berkeley
- Scientific career
- Fields: Experimental physics
- Workplaces: Dartmouth College
- Website: Robyn Millan at Dartmouth College

Robyn Margaret Millan is an American experimental physicist, best known for her work on radiation belts that surround the Earth.

== Education ==
Millan received a B.A. in Astronomy and Physics (1995), a M.A. in Physics (1999), and a Ph.D. in Physics (2002), all from the University of California, Berkeley.

== Career and impact ==
Millan is a professor of physics and astronomy at Dartmouth College. Her research includes the use of high-altitude scientific balloon experiments to study Earth's radiation belts, specifically, the loss of relativistic electrons from the outer radiation belts into Earth's atmosphere. Millan is principal investigator for the BARREL (Balloon Array for RBSP Relativistic Electron Losses) project, in which a total of 47 balloon launches floated in the circular wind patterns above the South Pole in 2013 and 2014 and above Sweden in 2015 and 2016. Each balloon measured X-rays produced by the rain of relativistic electrons falling to Earth from the Van Allen radiation belts. The first test of BARREL—funded by NASA and also supported by NSF's Office of Polar Programs that supports logistics of all research in Antarctica—began in December 2008.

Her prior positions include research appointments at Dartmouth and at the University of California, Berkeley. Millan served on the NRC Committee on the role and scope of mission-enabling activities in NASA's space and earth science missions and on the panel on solar wind-magnetosphere interactions for the committee for a decadal strategy for solar and space physics.

Millan has inspired several young researchers as a positive influence on women in the area of space physics. A former student and project manager for the SpaceX launch, Julianna Scheiman, made efforts to re-land the first stage booster and has worked for the SES-9 launch. Scheiman worked with Milan on the very early BARREL prototype payloads and conducted her senior thesis on the BARREL piggyback test flight.

== Awards and honours ==
In 2017, Millan received the NASA Exceptional Public Achievement Medal. In 2011, Millan received the Dartmouth Dean of the Faculty award for outstanding mentoring and advising and for overall career distinction. In 1995, Millan received the Department of Astronomy's Dorthea Klumpke Roberts award.

== Selected works ==
- Breneman, AW; Halford, A; Millan, R; McCarthy, M; Fennell, J; Sample, J; Woodger, L; Hospodarsky, G; Wygant, JR; Cattell, CA; Goldstein, J; Malaspina, D; Kletzing, CA (2015). "Global-Scale Coherence Modulation of Radiation-Belt Electron Loss from Plasmaspheric Hiss". Nature. 523 (7559): 193–5. Bibcode:2015Natur.523..193B. doi:10.1038/nature14515. PMID 26123022. S2CID 205244036.
- Clilverd, Mark A.; Rodger, Craig J.; Millan, Robyn M.; Sample, John G.; Kokorowski, Michael; McCarthy, Michael P.; Ulich, Thomas; Raita, Tero; Kavanagh, Andrew J.; Spanswick, Emma (2007). "Energetic Particle Precipitation into the Middle Atmosphere Triggered by a Coronal Mass Ejection" (PDF). Journal of Geophysical Research. 112 (A12 (Space Physics)): n/a. Bibcode:2007JGRA..11212206C. doi:10.1029/2007ja012395.
- Millan, R. M.; Lin, R. P.; Smith, D. M.; McCarthy, M. P. (2007). "Observation of Relativistic Electron Precipitation During a Rapid Decrease of Trapped Relativistic Electron Flux". Geophysical Research Letters. 34 (10): L10101. Bibcode:2007GeoRL..3410101M. doi:10.1029/2006gl028653.
- Millan, Robyn Margaret; Lin, R. P.; Smith, D. M.; Lorentzen, K. R.; McCarthy, M. P. (2002). "X-Ray Observations of MeV Electron Precipitation with a Balloon-Borne Germanium Spectrometer". Geophysical Research Letters. 29 (24): 47-1 – 47-4. Bibcode:2002GeoRL..29.2194M. doi:10.1029/2002gl015922. S2CID 121379165.
- Yando, Karl; Millan, Robyn M.; Green, Janet C.; Evans, David S. (2011). "A Monte Carlo Simulation of the NOAA POES Medium Energy Proton and Electron Detector Instrument". Journal of Geophysical Research. 116 (A10 (Space Physics)): n/a. Bibcode:2011JGRA..11610231Y. doi:10.1029/2011ja016671.
