= Solar-C =

Planned Sun-observing satellite

- Names: Solar-C; High-sensitivity Solar Ultraviolet Spectroscopic Satellite (official)
- Mission type: Heliophysics
- Operator: Japan Aerospace Exploration Agency (JAXA), National Astronomical Observatory of Japan (NAOJ)
- Website: solar-c.nao.ac.jp/en/
- Mission duration: 2 years (planned)

Spacecraft properties
- Launch mass: 500 kg (1,100 lb)
- Dimensions: 4.8 m (16 ft) height

Start of mission
- Launch date: 2028 (planned)
- Rocket: Epsilon S

Orbital parameters
- Reference system: Sun-synchronous orbit (>600 km (370 mi))
Instruments
- EUVST: Extreme Ultraviolet High-Throughput Spectroscopic Telescope
- SoSpIM: Solar Spectral Irradiance Monitor

Solar-C (official name "High-sensitivity Solar Ultraviolet Spectroscopic Satellite") is a planned Sun-observing satellite being developed by the Japan Aerospace Exploration Agency (JAXA), the National Astronomical Observatory of Japan (NAOJ), and international collaborators. It will be the follow-up to the Hinode (Solar-B) and Yohkoh (Solar-A) missions and will carry the EUV High-throughput Spectroscopic Telescope (EUVST) and the Solar Spectral Irradiance Monitor (SoSpIM). It is scheduled to launch in fiscal year 2028.

== Objectives ==
The mission aims to study the Sun, its effects on Earth and the Solar System, and the mechanisms behind hot plasma formation. The satellite will also analyse the Sun's UV radiation spectrum.

== See also ==
- Multi-slit Solar Explorer
