= Hinode (satellite) =

Japanese satellite

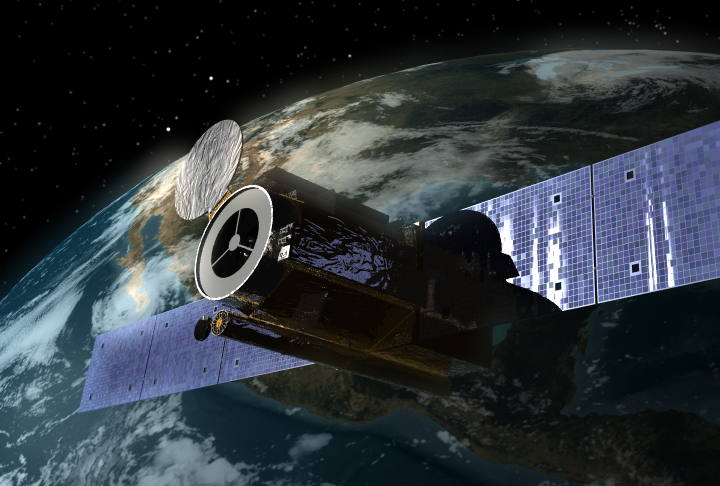
- Artist's impression of the Hinode spacecraft in orbit
- Names: Solar-B
- Mission type: Heliophysics
- Operator: JAXA / NASA / PPARC
- COSPAR ID: 2006-041A
- SATCAT no.: 29479
- Website: JAXA Hinode mission, NASA Hinode mission
- Mission duration: 19 years, 6 months, 27 days (elapsed)

Spacecraft properties
- Manufacturer: Mitsubishi Electric
- Launch mass: 700 kg (1,500 lb)

Start of mission
- Launch date: 22 September 2006, 21:36 UTC
- Rocket: M-V (2)
- Launch site: LP-M, Uchinoura Space Center
- Contractor: ISAS

Orbital parameters
- Reference system: Geocentric
- Regime: Sun-synchronous orbit
- Semi-major axis: 7,044 km (4,377 mi)
- Perigee altitude: 662.1 km (411.4 mi)
- Apogee altitude: 685.5 km (425.9 mi)
- Inclination: 98.1°
- Period: 98.1 minutes

Instruments
- Solar Optical Telescope (SOT); X-ray Telescope (XRT); Extreme-Ultraviolet Imaging Spectrometer (EIS)

Hinode (/ˈhiːnoʊdeɪ/; Japanese: ひので, IPA: [çinode], Sunrise), formerly Solar-B, is a Japan Aerospace Exploration Agency Solar mission with United States and United Kingdom collaboration. It is the follow-up to the Yohkoh (Solar-A) mission and it was launched on the final flight of the M-V rocket from Uchinoura Space Center, Japan on 22 September 2006 at 21:36 UTC (23 September, 06:36 JST). Its initial orbit was perigee height 280 km (170 mi), apogee height 686 km (426 mi), inclination 98.3 degrees, after which the satellite maneuvered to the quasi-circular Sun-synchronous orbit over the day/night terminator, which allows near-continuous observation of the Sun. On 28 October 2006, the probe's instruments captured their first images.

The data from Hinode are being downloaded to the Norwegian, terrestrial Svalsat station, operated by Kongsberg a few kilometres west of Longyearbyen, Svalbard. From there, data is transmitted by Telenor through a fibre-optic network to mainland Norway at Harstad, and on to data users in North America, Europe and Japan.

== Mission ==
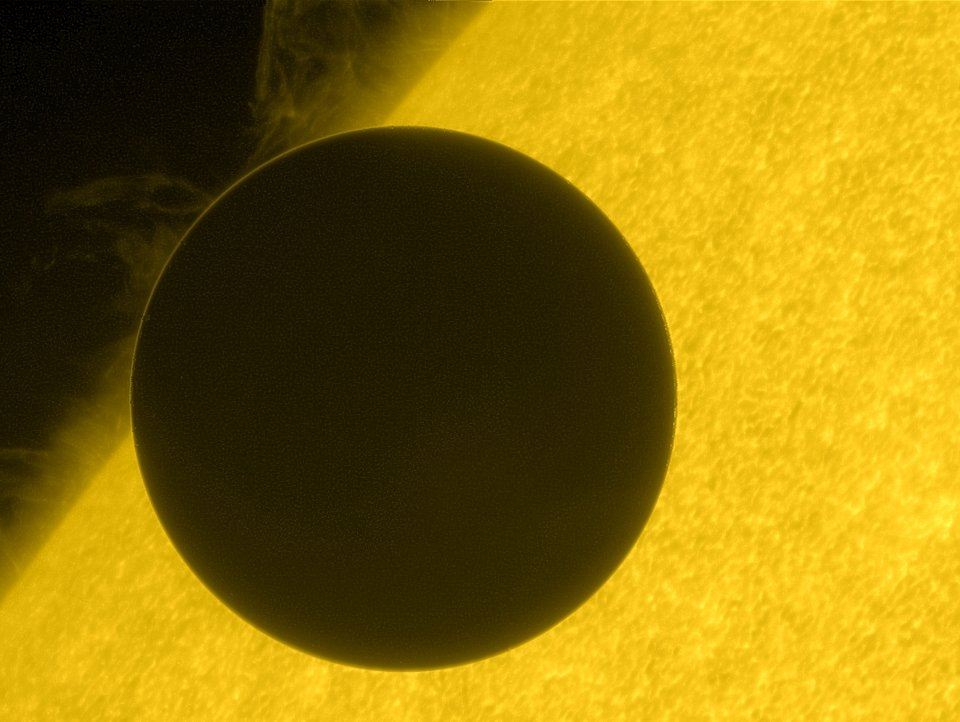
Hinode's view of the 2012 Venus transit

Hinode was planned as a three-year mission to explore the magnetic fields of the Sun. It consists of a coordinated set of optical, extreme ultraviolet (EUV), and x-ray instruments to investigate the interaction between the Sun's magnetic field and its corona. The result will be an improved understanding of the mechanisms that power the solar atmosphere and drive solar eruptions. The EUV imaging spectrometer (EIS) was built by a consortium led by the Mullard Space Science Laboratory (MSSL) in the UK. NASA, the space agency of the United States, was involved with three science instrument components: the Focal Plane Package (FPP), the X-Ray Telescope (XRT), and the Extreme Ultraviolet Imaging Spectrometer (EIS) and shares operations support for science planning and instrument command generation.

As of March 2024, the operation is planned to continue until 2033.

== Instruments ==
Hinode carries three main instruments to study the Sun.

=== SOT (Solar Optical Telescope) ===
A 0.5 meter Gregorian optical telescope with an angular resolution of about 0.2 arcsecond over the field of view of about 400 x 400 arcsec. At the SOT focal plane, the Focal Plane Package (FPP) built by the Lockheed Martin Solar and Astrophysics Laboratory in Palo Alto, California consists of three optical instruments: the Broadband Filter Imager (BFI) which produces images of the solar photosphere and chromosphere in six wide-band interference filters; the Narrowband Filter Imager (NFI) which is a tunable Lyot-type birefringent filter capable of producing magnetogram and dopplergram images of the solar surface; and the Spectropolarimeter (SP) which produces the most sensitive vector magnetograph maps of the photosphere to date.

The FPP also includes a Correlation Tracker (CT) which locks onto solar granulation to stabilize the SOT images to a fraction of an arcsecond. The spatial resolution of the SOT is a factor of 5 improvement over previous space-based solar telescopes (e.g., the MDI instrument on the SOHO).

=== XRT (X-ray Telescope) ===
A modified Wolter I telescope design that uses grazing incidence optics to image the solar corona's hottest components (0.5 to 10 Million K) with an angular resolution consistent with 1 arcsec pixels at the CCD. The telescope has an imaging field of view of 34 arcminutes. It is capable of capturing an image of the full sun when pointed at the center of the solar disk. The telescope was designed and built by Smithsonian Astrophysical Observatory (SAO), which, with the Harvard College Observatory (HCO) form the Harvard-Smithsonian Center for Astrophysics (CfA). The camera was developed by NAOJ and JAXA.

=== EIS (Extreme-Ultraviolet Imaging Spectrometer) ===
A normal incidence extreme ultraviolet (EUV) spectrometer that obtains spatially resolved spectra in two wavelength bands: 17.0–21.2 and 24.6–29.2 nm. Spatial resolution is around 2 arcsec, and the field of view is up to 560 x 512 arcsec^{2}. The emission lines in the EIS wavelength bands are emitted at temperatures ranging from 50,000 K to 20 million K. EIS is used to identify the physical processes involved in heating the solar corona.

== See also ==
- Sunrise – balloon-borne solar telescope
- Solar-C – planned follow-up to Hinode
