= Henry B. Winter =

German-American architect

Henry B. Winter was a late 19th-century German-American architect. He was born in Germany in 1883. Raised in Manhattan, Kansas, he was a graduate of Kansas State University, (then Kansas State Agricultural College). His mentor at the university was the architect John Daniel Walters, founder of Kansas State University's College of Architecture.

Winter helped design and build many buildings in Manhattan, Kansas. He ran, together with Daniel Walters, a son of John Daniel Walters, the architectural firm Winter and Walters from 1908 to 1909. Many of his buildings are listed on the Manhattan Register of Historic Places and the National Register of Historic Places.

Buildings he designed in Manhattan include the Second Baptist Church in 1917, the O.W. Holt Building Manhattan in 1911, and the Congregation Society Church Manhattan in 1911.
