= Solar magnetogram =

Graphic of the solar magnetic field

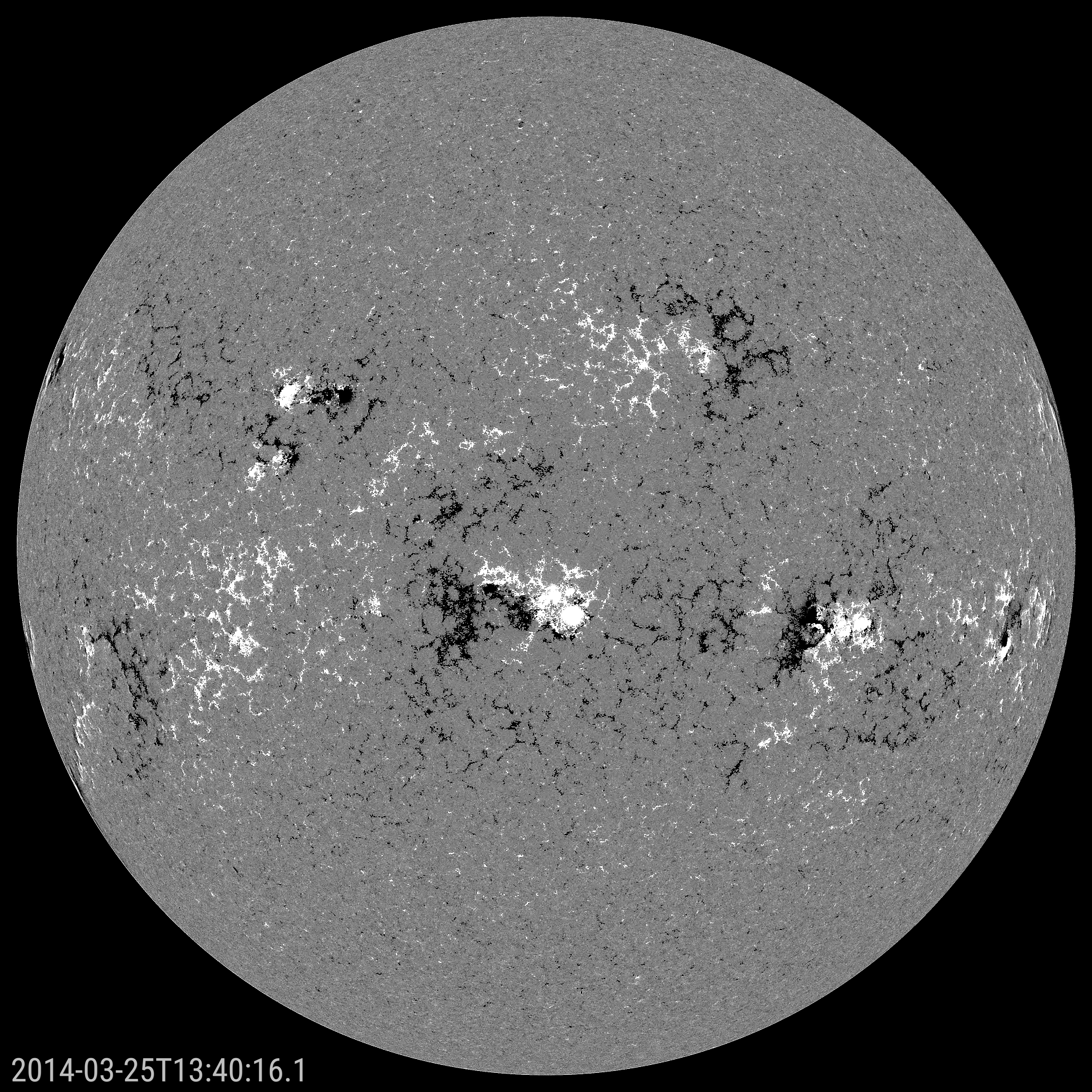
A magnetogram produced by the Helioseismic and Magnetic Imager aboard the Solar Dynamics Observatory

In solar observation, a magnetogram is a pictorial representation of the spatial variations in strength of the solar magnetic field.

Solar magnetograms are produced by solar magnetographs. Some magnetographs only measure the absolute value of the magnetic field strength while others are capable of measuring the 3-dimensional magnetic field. The latter are referred to as vector magnetographs. These measurements are made by exploiting the Zeeman effect or, less frequently, the Hanle effect.

The first magnetograph was constructed by George Ellery Hale in 1908.
