= Solar Dynamics Observatory =

NASA mission, launched in 2010 to GSO

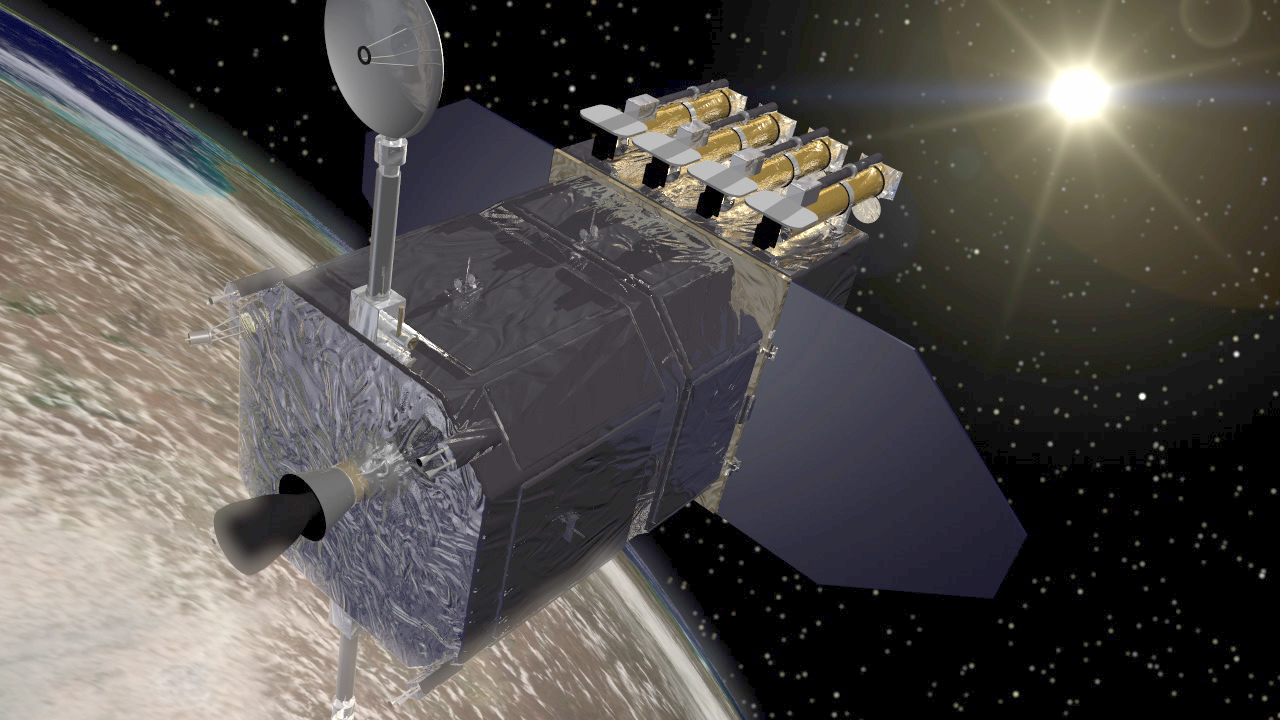
- Solar Dynamics Observatory satellite
- Names: SDO
- Mission type: Solar research
- Operator: NASA GSFC
- COSPAR ID: 2010-005A
- SATCAT no.: 36395
- Website: http://sdo.gsfc.nasa.gov
- Mission duration: 5 years (planned); 16 years, 7 months, 22 days (elapsed)

Spacecraft properties
- Spacecraft type: Solar Dynamics Observatory
- Manufacturer: Goddard Space Flight Center
- Launch mass: 3,100 kg (6,800 lb)
- Dry mass: 1,700 kg (3,700 lb)
- Payload mass: 290 kg (640 lb)

Start of mission
- Launch date: 11 February 2010, 15:23:00 UTC
- Rocket: Atlas V 401
- Launch site: Cape Canaveral, SLC-41
- Contractor: United Launch Alliance

Orbital parameters
- Reference system: Geocentric orbit
- Regime: Geosynchronous orbit
- Longitude: 102° West
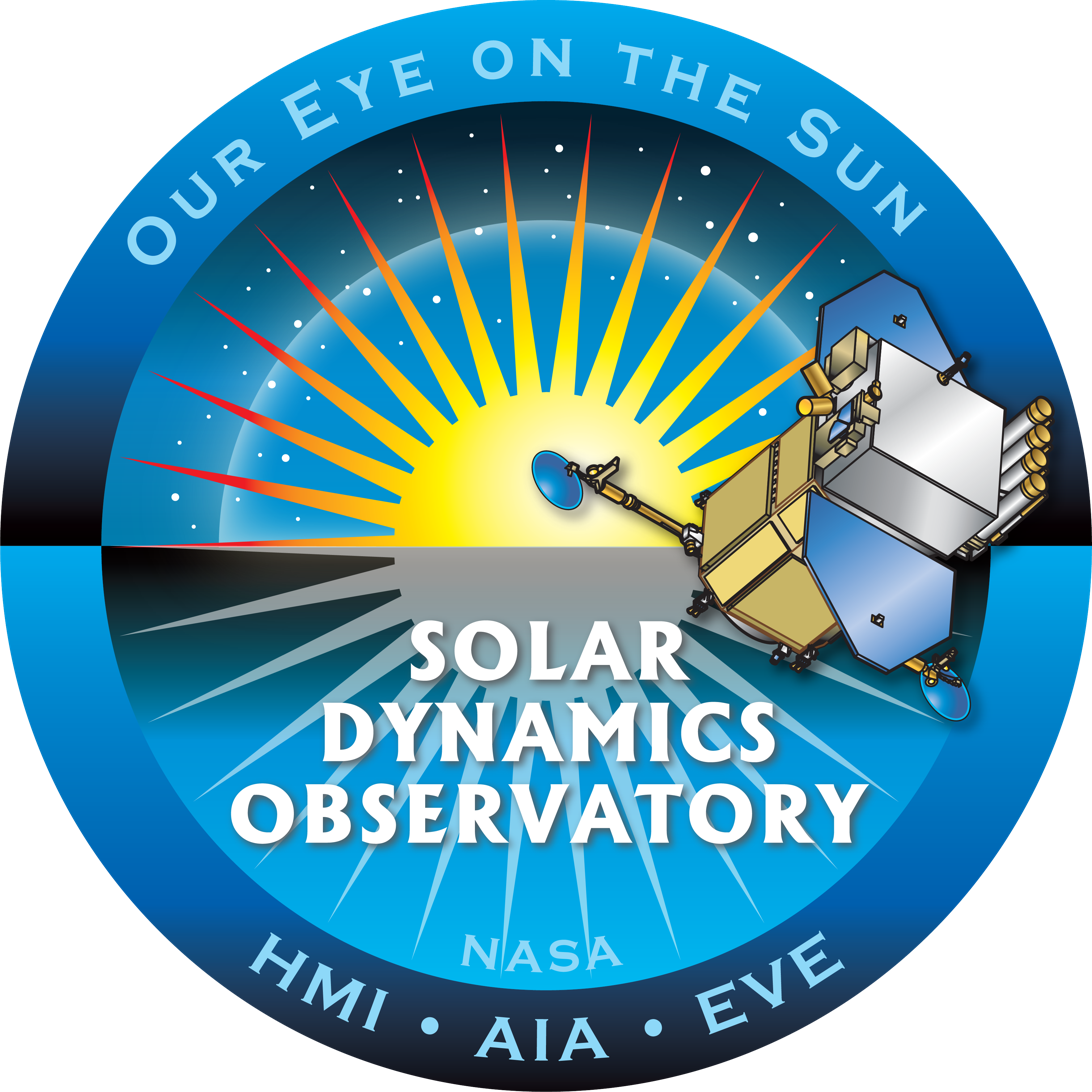
- Solar Dynamics Observatory patch Large Strategic Science Missions; Heliophysics Division Living With a Star program

The detailed images recorded by SDO in 2011–2012 have helped scientists uncover new secrets about the Sun.

The Solar Dynamics Observatory (SDO) is a NASA mission which has been observing the Sun since 2010. Launched on 11 February 2010, the observatory is part of the Living With a Star (LWS) program.

The goal of the LWS program is to develop the scientific understanding necessary to effectively address those aspects of the connected Sun–Earth system directly affecting life on Earth and its society. The goal of the SDO is to understand the influence of the Sun on the Earth and near-Earth space by studying the solar atmosphere on small scales of space and time and in many wavelengths simultaneously. SDO has been investigating how the Sun's magnetic field is generated and structured, how this stored magnetic energy is converted and released into the heliosphere and geospace in the form of solar wind, energetic particles, and variations in the solar irradiance.

== General ==
This visualization covers the same time span of 17 hours over the full wavelength range of the SDO.

The SDO spacecraft was developed at NASA's Goddard Space Flight Center in Greenbelt, Maryland, and launched on 11 February 2010, from Cape Canaveral Air Force Station (CCAFS). The primary mission lasted five years and three months, with expendables expected to last at least ten years. Some consider SDO to be a follow-on mission to the Solar and Heliospheric Observatory (SOHO).

SDO is a three-axis stabilized spacecraft, with two solar arrays, and two high-gain antennas, in an inclined geosynchronous orbit around Earth.

The spacecraft includes three instruments:

- the Extreme Ultraviolet Variability Experiment (EVE) built in partnership with the University of Colorado Boulder's Laboratory for Atmospheric and Space Physics (LASP),
- the Helioseismic and Magnetic Imager (HMI) built in partnership with Stanford University, and
- the Atmospheric Imaging Assembly (AIA) built in partnership with the Lockheed Martin Solar and Astrophysics Laboratory (LMSAL).

Data which are collected by the craft are made available as soon as possible after reception.

=== Extended mission ===
As of February 2020, SDO is expected to remain operational until 2030. In August 2025, Nasa and IBM unveiled Surya Heliophysics Foundational Model, an artificial intelligence model trained on 9 years of observations from SDO. The model can be used to provide early warnings to satellite operators and helps scientists predict how the Sun’s ultraviolet output affects Earth’s upper atmosphere.

== Instruments ==
=== Helioseismic and Magnetic Imager (HMI) ===
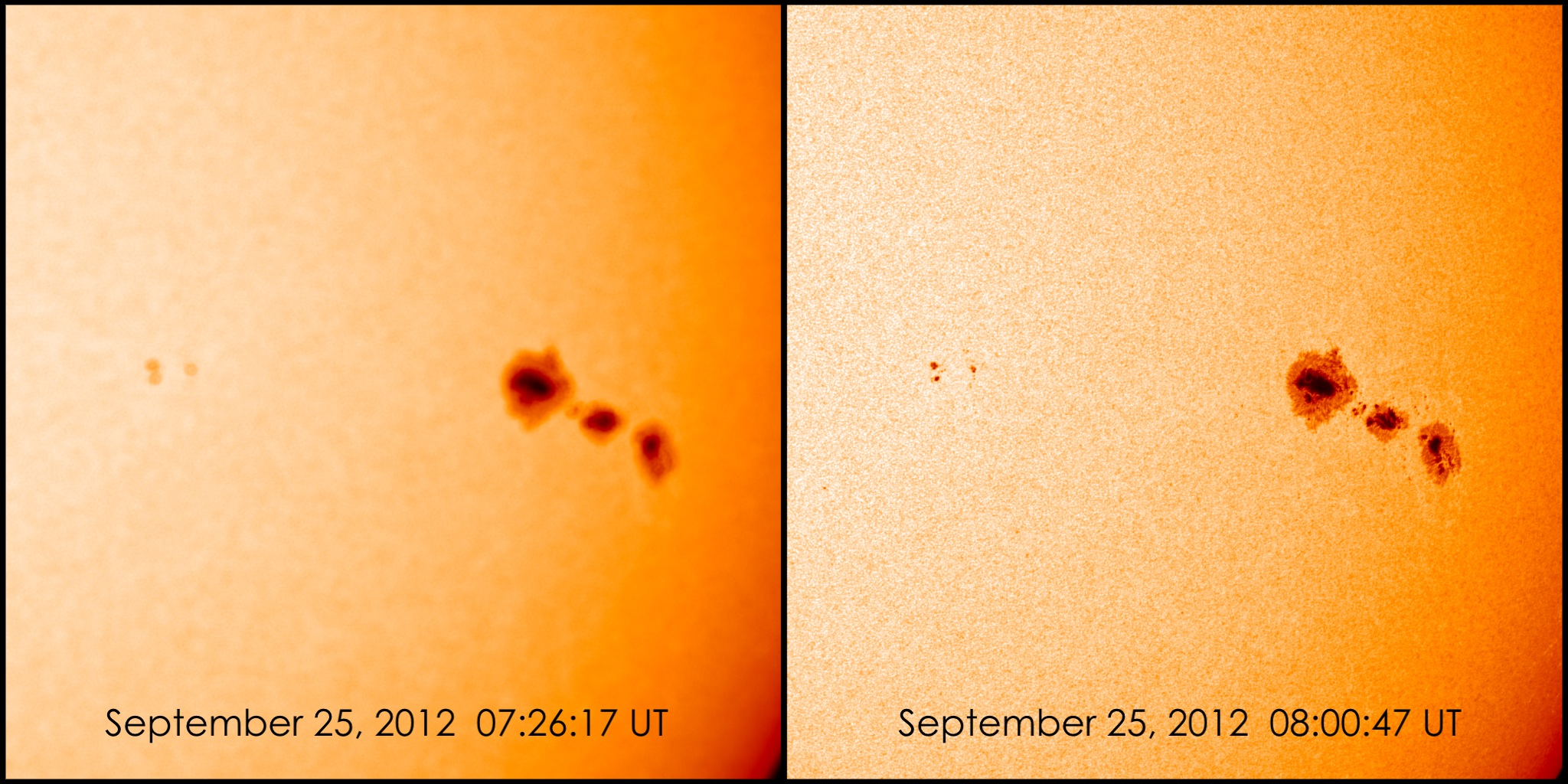
Comparison of HMI Continuum images immediately after an eclipse, and then after the sensor has re-warmed.

The Helioseismic and Magnetic Imager (HMI), led from Stanford University in Stanford, California, studies solar variability and characterizes the Sun's interior and the various components of magnetic activity. HMI takes high-resolution measurements of the longitudinal and vector magnetic field by viewing the entirety of the Sun's disk, with emphasis on various concentrations of metals in the Sun; specifically it passes the light (the variety of usable frequencies of which are centered on the solar spectrum's 617.3-nm Fraunhofer line) through five filter instruments including a Lyot filter and two Michelson interferometers to rapidly and frequently create Doppler images and magnetograms. The full-disk focus and advanced magnetometers improve on the capabilities of SOHO's MDI instrument which could only focus within the line of sight with limited magnetic data.

HMI produces data to determine the interior sources and mechanisms of solar variability and how the physical processes inside the Sun are related to surface magnetic field and activity. It also produces data to enable estimates of the coronal magnetic field for studies of variability in the extended solar atmosphere. HMI observations will enable establishing the relationships between the internal dynamics and magnetic activity in order to understand solar variability and its effects.

=== Extreme Ultraviolet Variability Experiment (EVE) ===
The Extreme Ultraviolet Variability Experiment (EVE) measures the Sun's extreme ultraviolet irradiance with improved spectral resolution, temporal cadence, accuracy, and precision over preceding measurements made by TIMED SEE, SOHO, and SORCE XPS. Some key requirements for EVE are to measure the solar EUV irradiance spectrum with 0.1 nm spectral resolution and with 20 sec cadence. These drive the EVE design to include grating spectrographs with array detectors so that all EUV wavelengths can be measured simultaneously. The instrument incorporates physics-based models in order to further scientific understanding of the relationship between solar EUV variations and magnetic variation changes in the Sun.

The Sun's output of energetic extreme ultraviolet photons is primarily what heats the Earth's upper atmosphere and creates the ionosphere. Solar EUV radiation output undergoes constant changes, both moment to moment and over the Sun's 11-year solar cycle, and these changes are important to understand because they have a significant impact on atmospheric heating, satellite drag, and communications system degradation, including disruption of the Global Positioning System.

The EVE instrument package was built by the University of Colorado Boulder's Laboratory for Atmospheric and Space Physics (LASP), with Dr. Tom Woods as principal investigator, and was delivered to NASA Goddard Space Flight Center on 7 September 2007. The instrument provides improvements of up to 70% in spectral resolution measurements in the wavelengths below 30 nm, and a 30% improvement in time cadence by taking measurements every 10 seconds over a 100% duty cycle.

=== Atmospheric Imaging Assembly (AIA) ===
The Atmospheric Imaging Assembly (AIA), led from the Lockheed Martin Solar and Astrophysics Laboratory (LMSAL), provides continuous full-disk observations of the solar chromosphere and corona in seven extreme ultraviolet (EUV) channels, spanning a temperature range from approximately 20,000 Kelvin to in excess of 20 million Kelvin. The 12-second cadence of the image stream with 4096 by 4096 pixel images at 0.6 arcsec/pixel provides unprecedented views of the various phenomena that occur within the evolving solar outer atmosphere.

The AIA science investigation is led by LMSAL, which also operates the instrument and – jointly with Stanford University – runs the Joint Science Operations Center from which all of the data are served to the worldwide scientific community, as well as the general public. LMSAL designed the overall instrumentation and led its development and integration. The four telescopes providing the individual light feeds for the instrument were designed and built at the Smithsonian Astrophysical Observatory (SAO). Since beginning its operational phase on 1 May 2010, AIA has operated successfully with unprecedented EUV image quality.

AIA wavelength channel	Source	Region of solar atmosphere	Characteristic temperature
White light (450 nm)	continuum	Photosphere	5000 K
170 nm	continuum	Temperature minimum, photosphere	5000 K
160 nm	C IV + continuum	Transition region and upper photosphere	100,000 and 5,000 K
33.5 nm	Fe XVI	Active region corona	2.5 million K
30.4 nm	He II	Chromosphere and transition region	50,000 K
21.1 nm	Fe XIV	Active region corona	2 million K
19.3 nm	Fe XII, XXIV	Corona and hot flare plasma	1.2 million and 20 million K
17.1 nm	Fe IX	Quiet corona, upper transition region	630,000 K
13.1 nm	Fe VIII, XX, XXIII	Flaring regions	400,000, 10 million, and 16 million K
9.4 nm	Fe XVIII	Flaring regions	6.3 million K

Photographs of the Sun in these various regions of the spectrum can be seen at NASA's SDO Data website. Images and movies of the Sun seen on any day of the mission, including within the last half-hour, can be found at The Sun Today.

== Communications ==
SDO down-links science data (K-band) from its two onboard high-gain antennas, and telemetry (S-band) from its two onboard omnidirectional antennas. The ground station consists of two dedicated (redundant) 18-meter radio antennas in White Sands Missile Range, New Mexico, constructed specifically for SDO. Mission controllers operate the spacecraft remotely from the Mission Operations Center at NASA Goddard Space Flight Center. The combined data rate is about 130 Mbit/s (150 Mbit/s with overhead, or 300 Msymbols/s with rate 1/2 convolutional encoding), and the craft generates approximately 1.5 Terabytes of data per day (equivalent to downloading around 500,000 songs).

== Launch ==
Attempt	Planned	Result	Turnaround	Reason	Decision point	Weather go (%)	Notes
1	10 Feb 2010, 3:26:00 pm	Scrubbed	—	Weather (high winds)	10 Feb 2010, 4:22 pm (T-3:59, immediately after T-4:00 hold)	40%	window 10:26 to 11:26 EST, attempts made at 10:26, 10:56 and 11:26 EST
2	11 Feb 2010, 3:23:00 pm	Success	0 days 23 hours 57 minutes			60%	Window: 10:23 to 11:23 EST

NASA's Launch Services Program at Kennedy Space Center managed the payload integration and launch. The SDO launched from Cape Canaveral Space Launch Complex 41 (SLC-41), utilizing an Atlas V-401 rocket with a RD-180 powered Common Core Booster, which has been developed to meet the Evolved Expendable Launch Vehicle (EELV) program requirements.

Sun dog phenomenon: Moments after launch, SDO's Atlas V rocket penetrated a cirrus cloud which created visible shock waves in the sky and destroyed the alignment of ice crystals that were forming a sun dog visible to onlookers.

After launch, the spacecraft was deployed from the Atlas V into an orbit around the Earth with an initial perigee of about 2,500 km (1,600 mi).

=== Transfer to final Orbit ===
Animation of Solar Dynamics Observatory's trajectory from 11 February 2010 to 11 April 2010 Solar Dynamics Observatory · Earth

SDO then underwent a series of orbit-raising maneuvers over a few weeks which adjusted its orbit until the spacecraft reached its planned circular, geosynchronous orbit at an altitude of 35,789 km (22,238 mi), at 102° West longitude, inclined at 28.5°. This orbit was chosen to allow 24/7 communications to/from the fixed ground station, and to minimise solar eclipses to about an hour a day for only a few weeks a year.

== Mission mascot - Camilla ==
Camilla Corona is a rubber chicken and is the mission mascot for SDO. It is part of the Education and public outreach team and assists with various functions to help educate the public, mainly children, about the SDO mission, facts about the Sun and Space weather. Camilla also assists in cross-informing the public about other NASA missions and space related projects. Camilla Corona SDO uses social media to interact with fans.

== Image gallery ==
SDO: Year 5

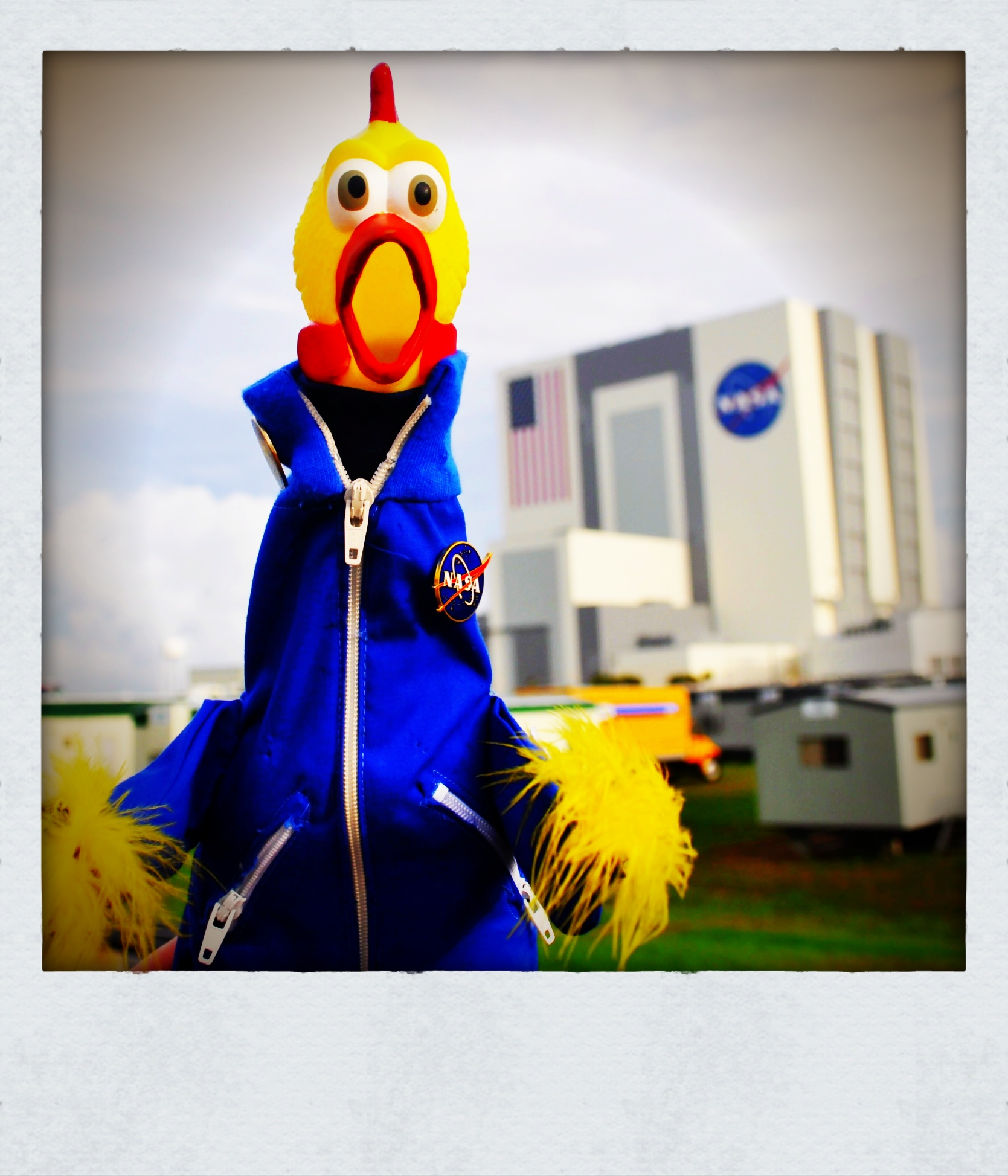
Camilla Corona SDO

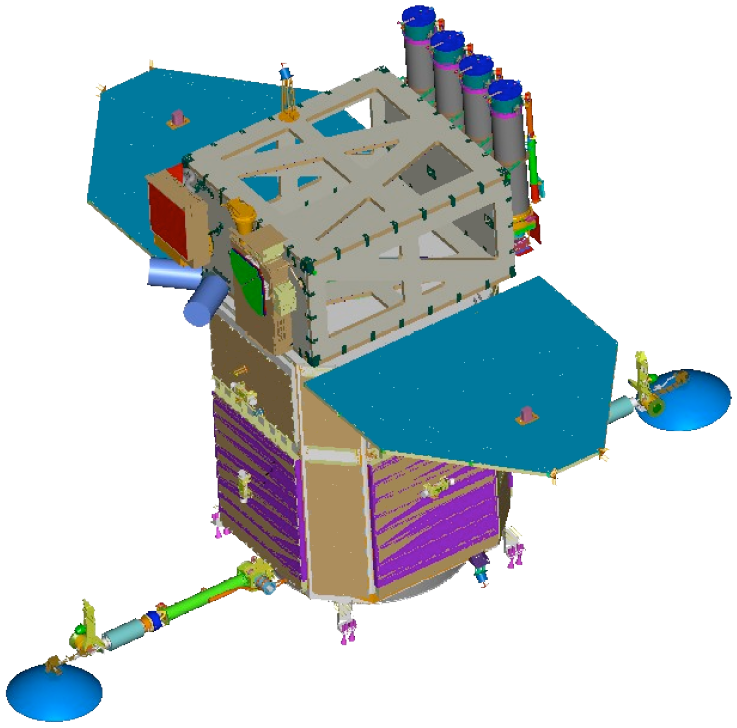
SDO 3-D schematic

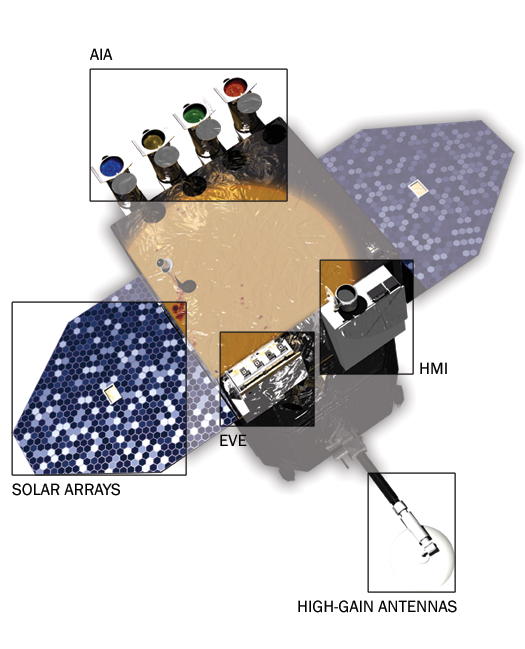
SDO Instruments

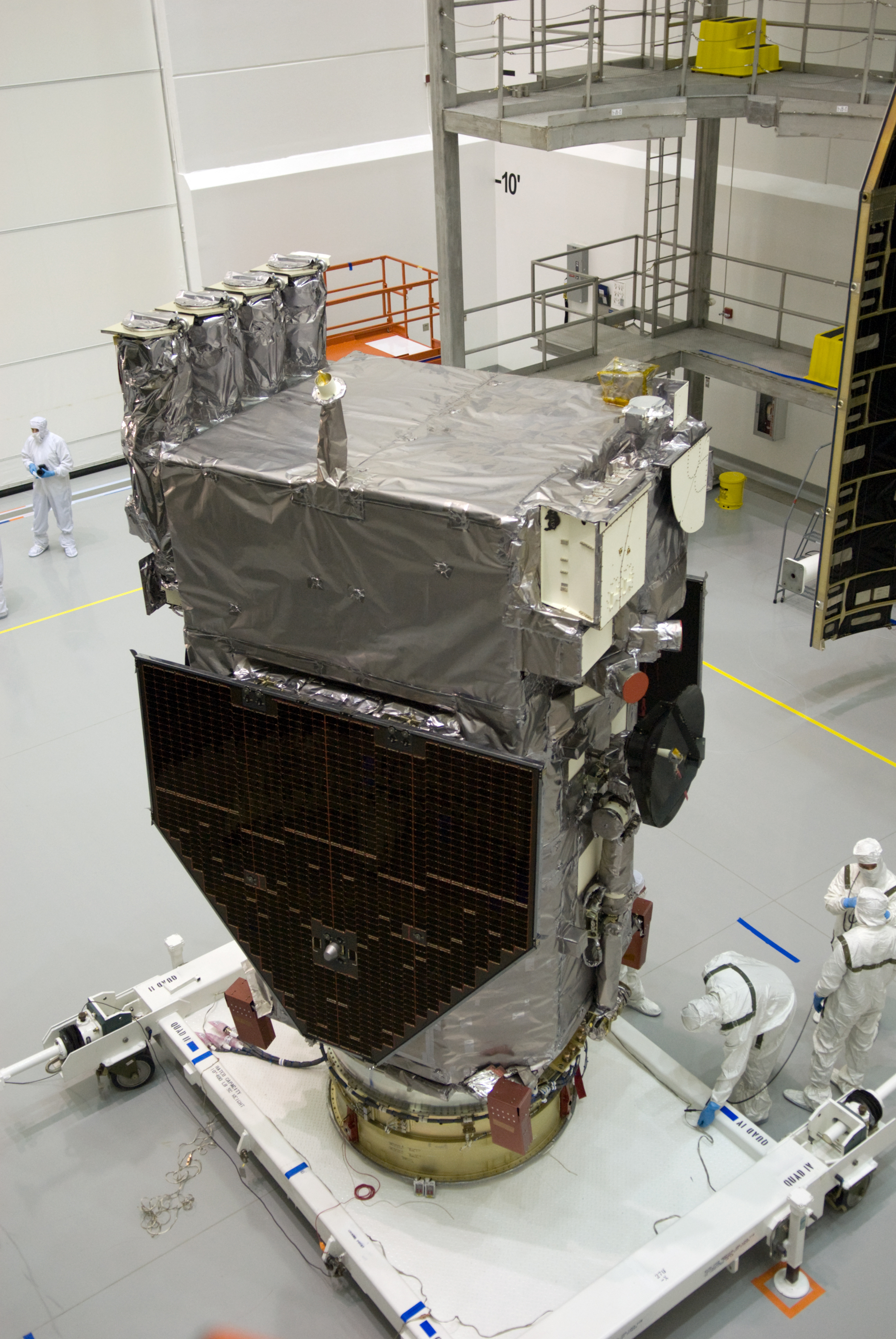
SDO ready to be placed on Atlas rocket for launch.

An animation showing the deployment of SDO.

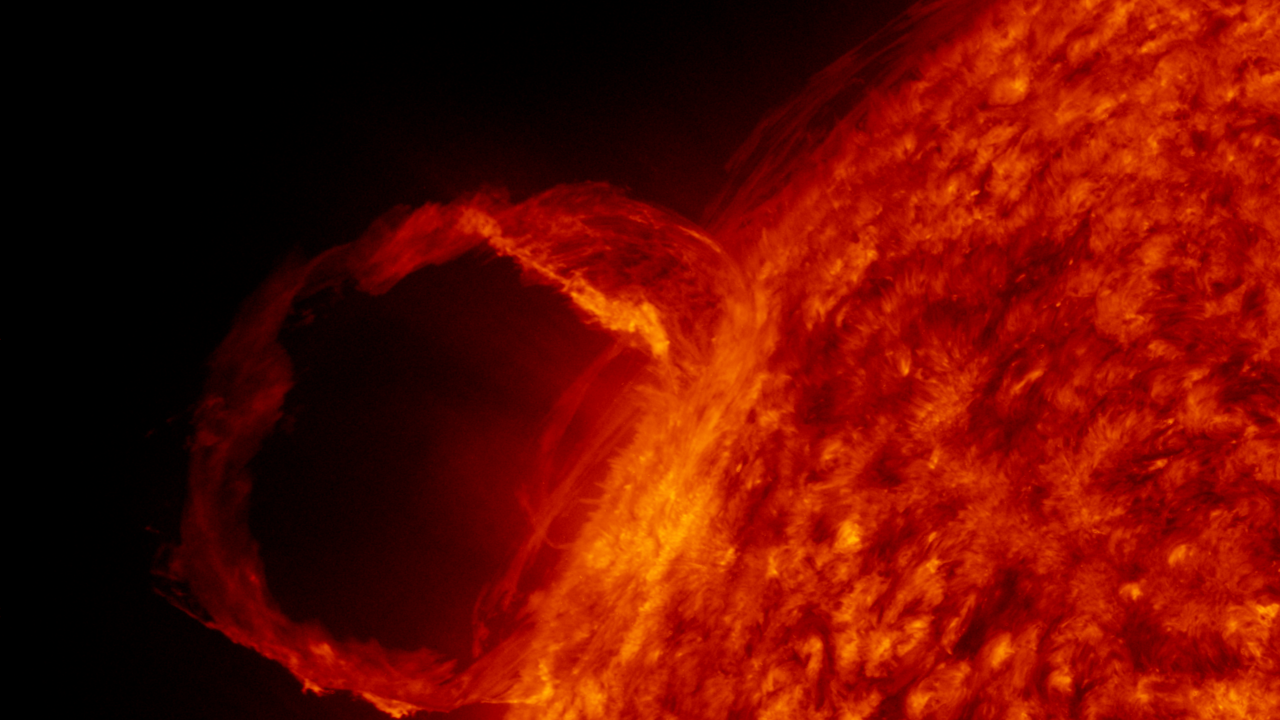
First light image from the SDO showing a prominence eruption.

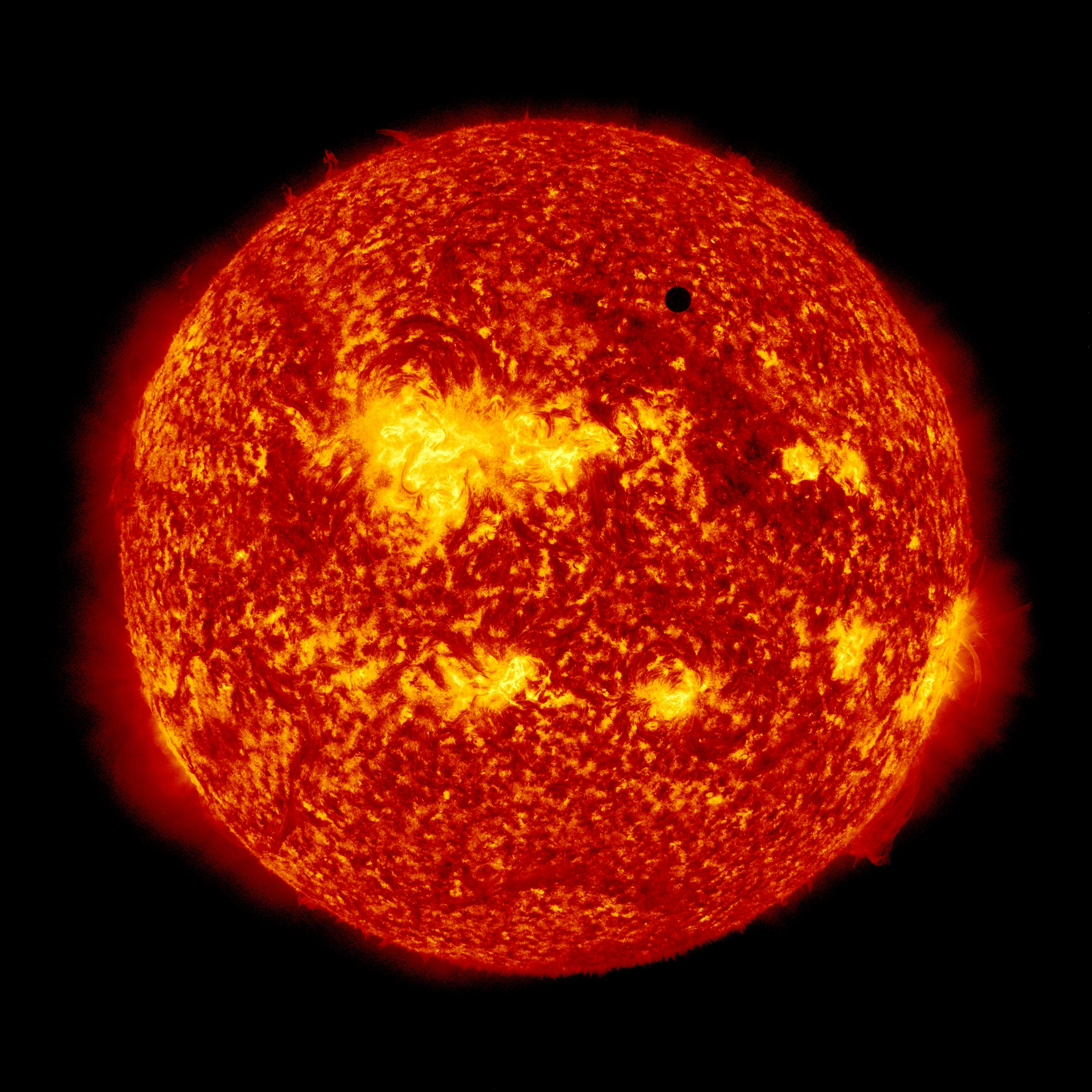
An image of the 2012 transit of Venus taken by SDO.

This movie opens with a full-disk view of the Sun in visible wavelengths. Then the filters are applied to small pie-shaped wedges of the Sun.

SDO has now captured nearly seven years worth of ultra-high resolution solar footage. This time lapse shows that full run from two of SDO's instruments.

== Stamps ==
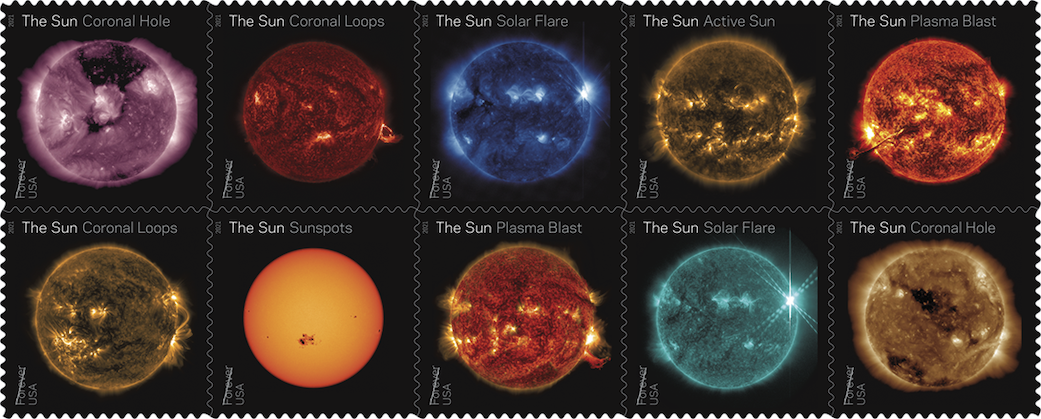
USPS-issued forever stamps featuring images of the Sun

In 2021, the United States Postal Service released a series of forever stamps using images of the Sun taken by the Solar Dynamics Observatory.

== See also ==
- Heliophysics
- Advanced Composition Explorer
- Parker Solar Probe
- Radiation Belt Storm Probes (Van Allen Probes)
- Richard R. Fisher
- Solar and Heliospheric Observatory (SOHO)
- STEREO (Solar TErrestrial RElations Observatory), launched 2006, 1 of 2 spacecraft still operational.
- Wind (spacecraft), launched 1994, still operational.
- List of heliophysics missions
