= Moreton wave =

Large-scale chromospheric perturbation

Animation of a Moreton wave which occurred on December 6, 2006

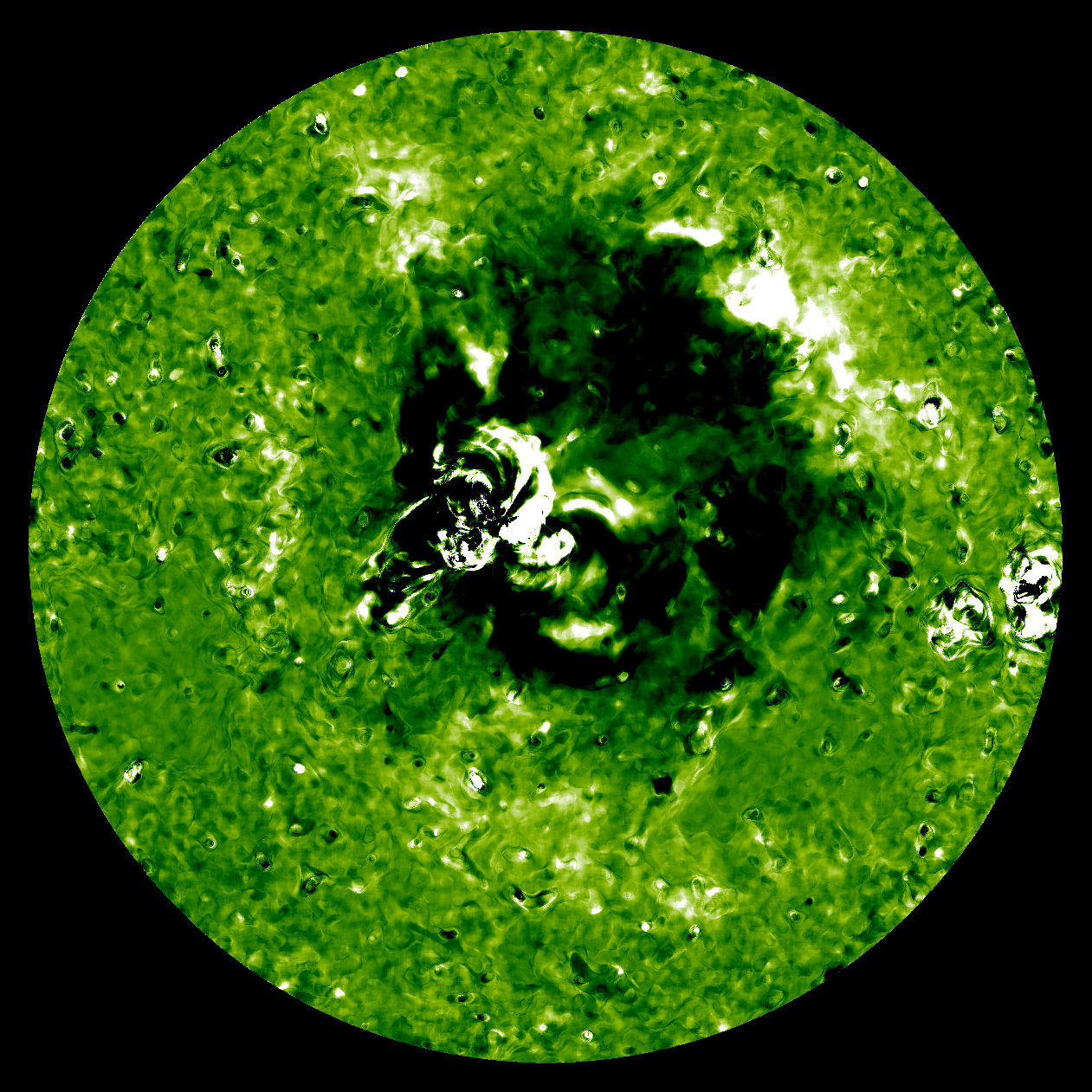
Solar Tsunami

A Moreton wave, Solar Tsunami, or Moreton-Ramsey wave is the chromospheric signature of a large-scale solar corona shock wave. Described as a kind of solar "tsunami", they are generated by solar flares. They are named for American astronomer Gail Moreton, an observer at the Lockheed Solar Observatory in Burbank, and Harry E. Ramsey, an observer who spotted them in 1959 at The Sacramento Peak Observatory. He discovered them in time-lapse photography of the chromosphere in the light of the Balmer alpha transition.

There were few follow-up studies for decades. Then the 1995 launch of the Solar and Heliospheric Observatory (SOHO) led to observation of coronal waves, which cause Moreton waves. Moreton waves were a research topic again. (SOHO's EIT instrument discovered another, different wave type called "EIT waves".) The reality of Moreton waves (also known as fast-mode MHD waves) has also been confirmed by the two Solar Terrestrial Relations Observatory (STEREO) spacecraft. They observed a 100,000-km-high wave of hot plasma and magnetism, moving at 250 km/s, in conjunction with a big coronal mass ejection in February 2009. Moreton measured the waves propagating at a speed of 500–1500 km/s. Yutaka Uchida interpreted Moreton waves as MHD fast mode shock waves propagating in the corona. He links them to type II radio bursts, which are radio-wave discharges created when coronal mass ejections accelerate shocks.

Moreton waves can be observed primarily in the Hα band.

== See also ==
- Asteroseismology
- Gravity wave
- Helioseismology
- OSO 8
- Solar prominence
- Solar spicule
- Solar transition region
