= Multi-slit Solar Explorer =

Planned Sun-observing satellite

Multi-slit Solar Explorer (MUSE)
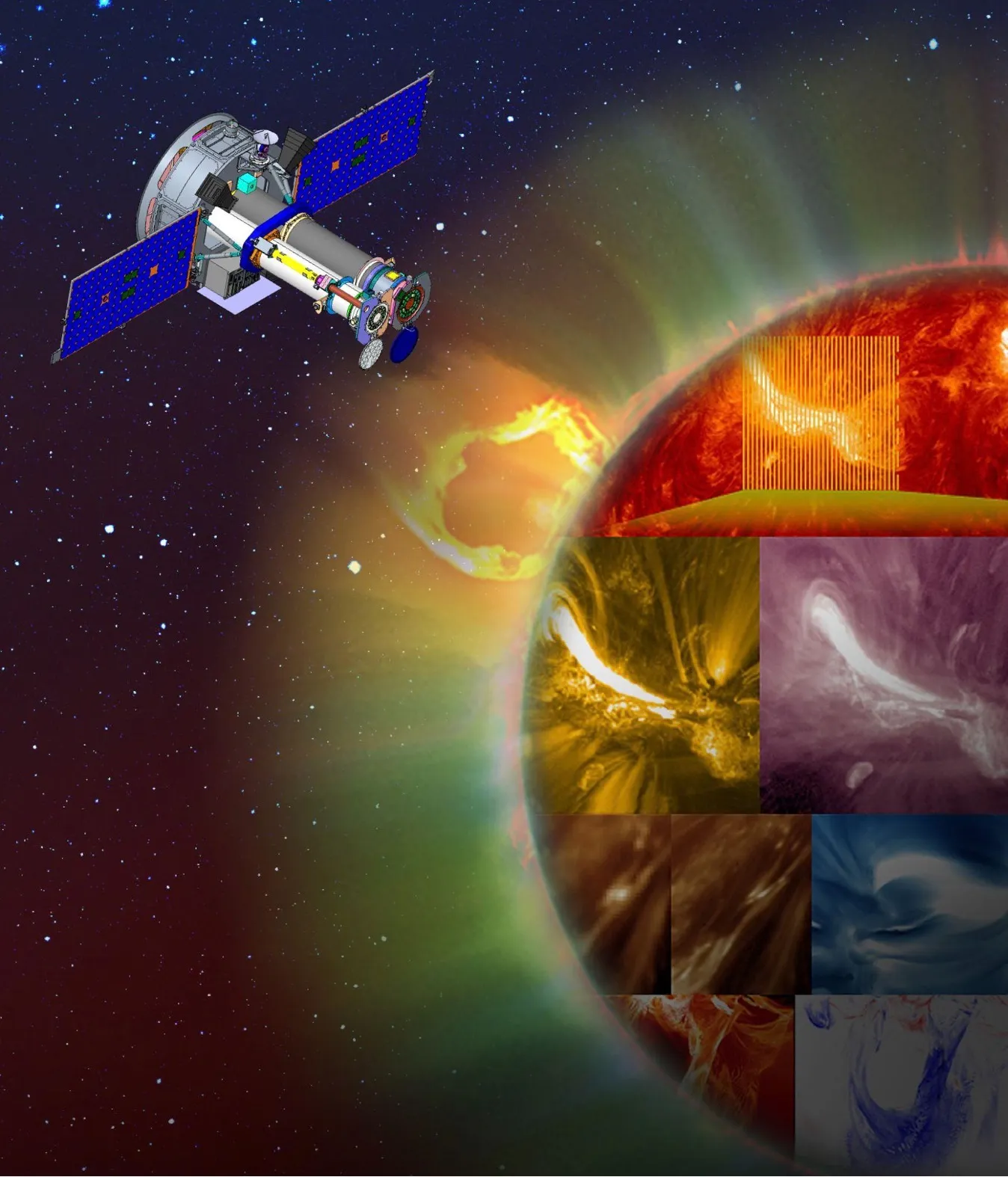
- Names: MUSE
- Mission type: Heliophysics
- Operator: NASA
- Website: https://muse.lmsal.com
- Mission duration: > 2 years prime mission

Spacecraft properties
- Spacecraft: MUSE
- Spacecraft type: Multi-slit spectrograph
- Manufacturer: Lockheed Martin Solar and Astrophysical Laboratory (LMSAL)
- Launch mass: 291 Kg

Start of mission
- Launch date: no earlier than 2027

Orbital parameters
- Regime: polar Sun-synchronous orbit
- Altitude: 640 km
- Inclination: 98 degrees
- Period: 97 min

Instruments
- Context imager and Multi-slit Spectrograph

The Multi-slit Solar Explorer (MUSE) is a future NASA mission to study the heating of the solar corona and the impact of solar eruptions and flares that are at the foundation of space weather. MUSE will have two instruments, a multi-slit extreme ultraviolet (EUV) spectrograph and an EUV context imager. The satellite will be launched no earlier than 2027.

MUSE is NASA’s first medium-class explorer mission (MIDEX) focused on solar physics. On 10 February 2022, NASA announced that MUSE and HelioSwarm were the winning candidates to become the next missions in the agency's MIDEX.

MUSE successfully passed its Preliminary Design Review (PDR, March 2024), NASA’s confirmation review (August 2024), and the Critical Design Review (CDR, April 2025). The mission is led by Dr. Bart De Pontieu at the Lockheed Martin Solar and Astrophysics Lab (LMSAL) in Palo Alto, California.

== Mission ==
MUSE is designed to deliver the high spatial resolution and temporal cadence necessary to understand the basic physical mechanisms that heat the multi-million degree solar atmosphere or corona of the Sun, and that drive solar activity such as the flares and eruptions at the foundation of space weather. In addition, MUSE is part of the key components of the Next Generation of Solar Physics Mission (NGSPM) which will observe the entire solar atmosphere combining MUSE, EUVST and DKIST telescopes.

MUSE is aiming to address the three main science goals:

- Determine which mechanisms heat the corona and are at the roots of the solar wind
- Understand the origin and evolution of the unstable solar atmosphere.
- Investigate fundamental physical plasma processes.

MUSE will provide simultaneous spectroscopy and imaging of the solar corona at very high spatial resolution of 0.5 arcseconds or better (resolving structures as small as 350 km on the Sun) while increasing the areal coverage and cadence by a factor of 30 to 100 compared to previous or planned spectrographs. The innovative multi-slit spectrograph will allow scientists to exploit the properties of the light from the Sun to determine detailed diagnostics of the plasma (or ionized gas) in the Sun’s atmosphere, including temperature, velocity and turbulent motions, over active region size fields-of-view within 8 to 20 seconds.

A key part of the MUSE science investigation is the comparison between advanced numerical modeling and high-resolution observations. MUSE will enable detailed studies of the multi-scale coupling of physical processes in the solar atmosphere, in which energy is often released on very small spatial scales of order a few 100 km or less, but rapidly impacts hundreds of thousands of km, e.g., when magnetic fields become unstable and lead to large explosions (flares) or eruptions (coronal mass ejections, CMEs). When such events propagate from the Sun into the Solar System, they lead to space weather, and often impact space-based and ground-based technological resources on Earth such as satellites, communications, power grids, etc. MUSE will provide key data to understand better how space weather events are triggered and propelled into the heliosphere.

== Spacecraft ==
The MUSE spacecraft has no consumables onboard and carries an S-band transponder for commanding and a Ka-band transmitter for telemetry downlink. It provides a stable platform for high-resolution observations. Inputs from the star trackers and guide telescope are used by the attitude control system (ACS) for fine Sun pointing. Selected hardware redundancy is implemented, including the star tracker and magnetometer electronics, reaction wheels, solar cells, and other electronics.

MUSE will be in a 620 km (or higher) Sun-synchronous orbit, giving it a 7-month season of uninterrupted observing each year. Data is downlinked through the Ka-band transmitter nine times/day to the Svalbard Ground Station in Norway and two times/day to other NEN stations. The average data rate that is downlinked during an observing day is 21 Mbit/s for a daily data volume of 230 Gbytes/day.

The MUSE launch is planned for no earlier than 2027 with a 2-year prime mission.

== Instruments ==
The MUSE consists of two instruments that both observe the Sun in EUV light, emission that is primarily emitted in the solar corona:

1. The Multi-slit Spectrograph (SG): an EUV integral field spectrograph with an innovative 35-slit design for high-throughput spectroscopy in three EUV passbands (108Å, 171Å and 284Å). These passbands are dominated by strong spectral lines that are emitted by highly ionized iron (Fe), which under coronal conditions forms at temperatures of 0.7 million K (Fe IX 171Å), 2.5 MK (Fe XV 284Å), and 10 MK (Fe XIX/Fe XXI 108Å). The spectrograph combines a 25 cm Newtonian telescope with a stigmatic, multi-slit EUV spectrograph to provide spectroscopy in three wavelength bands with spatial coverage of a solar active region in each exposure. At the focal plane, the 35-slit mask replaces the usual single-slit, and narrowband coatings on the primary and grating isolate the three wavelength regions to avoid overlap of unwanted spectral lines. Light is simultaneously collected along 35-slits, which are 0.4 arcsec wide, 170 arcsec long, and separated by 4.5 arcseconds. By scanning the small distance between neighboring slits, spectroscopic raster scans can be obtained over a region of 151 arcsec x 170 arcsec at a cadence of 8s (for flares) to 20-60s (active regions and quiet Sun).
2. The Context Imager (CI): a high-resolution EUV imager that obtains high resolution (better than 0.5 arcsec) images in two broad passbands centered around 195Å and 304Å. These passbands are dominated by Fe XII (sensitive to plasma around 1.5 MK) and He II (0.1 MK, i.e., the cooler transition region). The CI thus provides complementary data to the spectrograph, expanding the temperature range and the field-of-view (to 580 arcsec x 290 arcsec).

Both the spectrograph and imager benefit from an image stabilization system using a guide telescope.

MUSE also contains a student collaboration project called ASIO (the student Active Sun Irradiance Observer). ASIO is a high-cadence radiometer measuring disk-integrated solar flare emissions in soft x-ray (SXR), hard x-ray (HXR), and extreme ultraviolet (EUV). It will obtain X-ray and EUV light curves of the Sun at a cadence 200 times faster than the current GOES X-ray sensors. Students at Montana State University will lead the development and operation of ASIO.

== Team ==
MUSE will be managed from within Principal Investigator (PI) Dr. Bart De Pontieu’s home organization, the Lockheed Martin Solar and Astrophysics Laboratory (LMSAL), which is part of LM Advanced Technology Center (ATC). The ATC develops the spacecraft, spectrograph, guide telescope, and instrument mechanisms, mounting, and electronics. LMSAL leads science operations and high-level data processing at the Science Operations Center (SOC) in Palo Alto.

Harvard Smithsonian Astrophysical Observatory (SAO) has responsibility for the development of the Context Imager (CI) telescope and will be providing the Spectrograph (SG) front aperture and tube assembly.

Montana State University (MSU) provides SG design support and the ASIO Student Collaboration, a separate instrument designed to measure X-ray emission of the Sun at very high cadence/frequency.

The Space Dynamics Lab (SDL) of Utah State University provides the camera systems for both the SG and CI.

UC Berkeley Space Sciences Laboratory (SSL) is responsible for MUSE mission operations and level 0 data processing, at their Mission Operations Center (MOC).

NASA Goddard Space Flight Center (GSFC) provides SG design support and optical ground-support equipment.

SETI is responsible of the outreach program.

The MUSE Science Team includes Co-Investigators with instrumentation, observations & modeling expertise from LMSAL, SAO, MSU, GSFC, NASA Marshall Space Flight Center (MSFC), High Altitude Observatory (HAO), National Solar Observatory (NSO), UCB, UiO (University of Oslo,) Norway), ISP (The Institute for Solar Physics, Stockholm University, Sweden), St. Andrews University (UK), Northumbria University (UK), University of Glasgow (UK), MPS (Max Planck Institute for Solar System Research), PTB (Physikalisch-Technische Bundesanstalt), Germany), Naval Research Laboratory (NRL), University of Palermo (Italy), University of Catania (Italy), and the Commonwealth Scientific and Industrial Research Organisation (CSIRO), Australia).

MUSE is an international collaboration with the Norwegian Space Agency (NOSA) providing downlinks and science support; the Italian Space Agency (ASI) providing mirrors (Instituto Nazionale di Astrofisica, INAF, Brera), filters and calibration support (University of Palermo), environmental testing (University of Consiglio Nazionale delle Ricerche, CNR, Padova), and science support; and the German Aerospace Center (DLR) providing the grating, and calibration and science support (MPS).

== See also ==
- Explorer program
