= Solar plage =

Bright region in the Sun's chromosphere

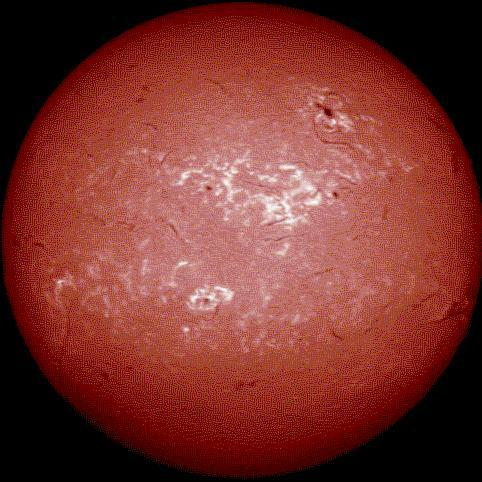
In this near true color photograph, taken through a narrowband hydrogen-alpha filter, plages are visible as overexposed patches.

A plage /pleɪdʒ/ is a bright region in the Sun's chromosphere, typically found in and around active regions. Historically, they have been referred to as bright flocculi, in contrast to dark flocculi, and as chromospheric faculae, in contrast to photospheric faculae.

== Etymology ==
The term plage is often believed to be poetically taken from the French word for "beach"; however, this is likely a misunderstanding of an 1893 article by Henri-Alexandre Deslandres where the name facular flames was suggested. In the article, Deslandres also refers to them as plages brillantes, meaning bright regions, which became the more commonly used term.

== Description ==
Classically, plage have been defined as regions that are bright in Hα and other chromospheric emission lines. With modern imaging, most researchers now identify plage based on the photospheric magnetic field concentration of the faculae below. The magnetic field of plage is confined to the intergranular lanes in the photosphere with a strength of around 1500 G, but expands into a volume filling canopy in the chromosphere with a field of around 450G.

It is believed that plage is formed from decaying emerging flux regions, and often acts as a footprint for coronal loops and fibrils, which makes them an important interface for coronal heating.

== See also ==
- Solar cycle
- Solar spicule
- Solar granule
