= Hyder flare =

Slow, large-scale brightening that occurs in the solar chromosphere

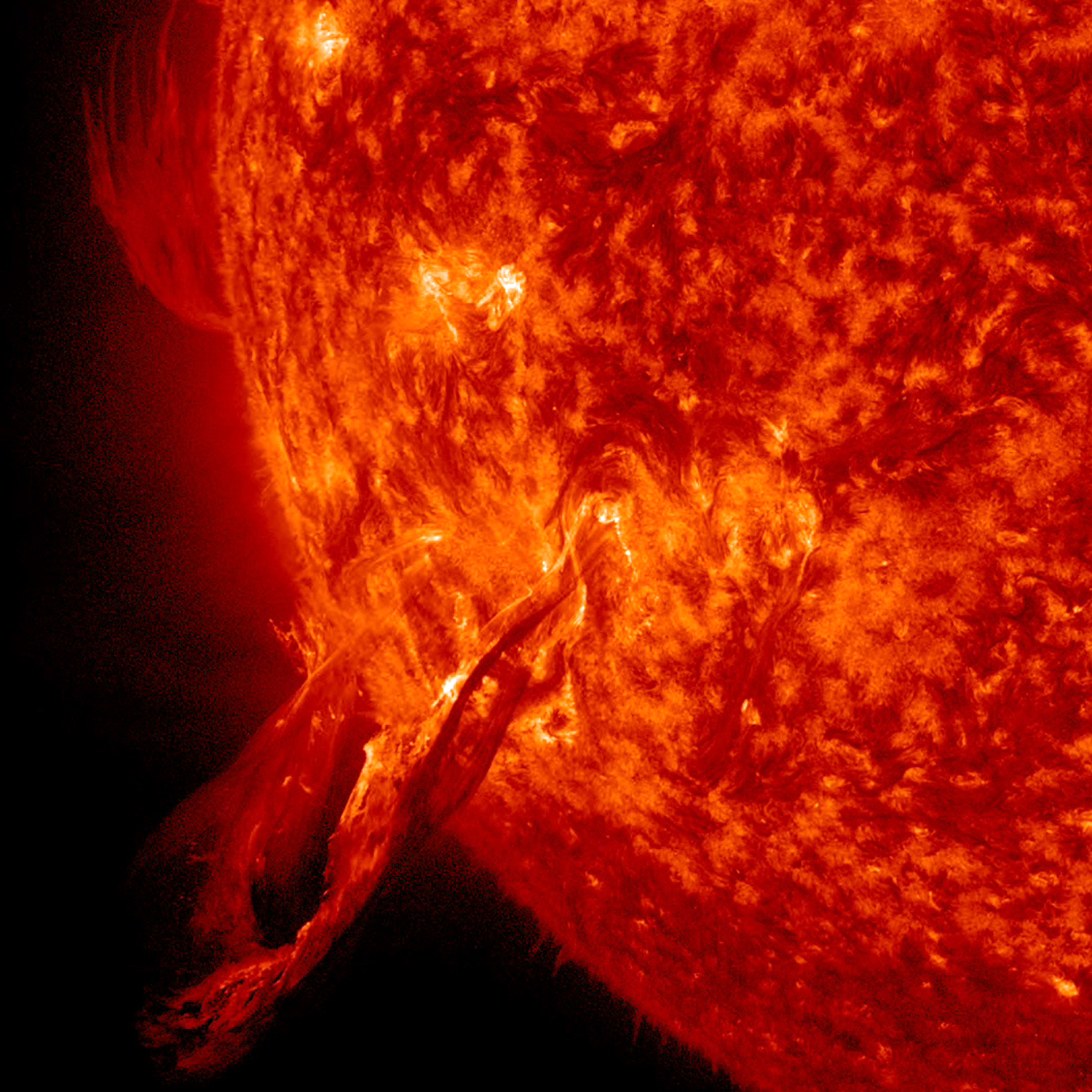
A picture recording a Hyder flare which occurred over a three-hour span, on November 1, 2014.

A Hyder flare is slow, large-scale brightening that occurs in the solar chromosphere. It resembles a large but feeble solar flare and is identifiable as the signature of the sudden disappearance of a solar prominence (a "disparition brusque"). These events occur in the quiet Sun, away from active regions or sunspot groups, and typically in the polar crown filament zone near the Sun's poles. Hyder flares have a two-ribbon morphology and can be faintly observed in chromospheric emission lines such as Hα or as enhanced absorption in He I 1083 nm line.

Hyder flares are caused by the unstable eruption of a magnetic filament channel; the filament rises and may escape from the Sun as a part of a coronal mass ejection, and the visible flare marks the magnetic connectivity of the coronal disturbance.

Unlike active region flares, Hyder flares take a much longer time to reach peak intensity, as much as 30 to 80 minutes and then can continue for several hours. They have not caused any interference with Earthly communications like solar flares, and are rather weak.

The discovery of Hyder flares has been mainly associated with Charles Hyder who developed the mechanism describing them in 1967. Some disagree with Hyder's findings and especially with his interesting mechanism, explaining what actually produces the flare.

Although rare, a notable occurrence that took place November 1, 2014, confirmed that they display special characteristics distinguishing them from solar flares.

== Cause ==
One explanation for these solar flares comes from Hyder's two-fold observations. First, such flares tend to have a parallel double-ribbon shape, with one ribbon on either side of the magnetic polarity inversion line under a filament. Second, these flares tend not to be associated with geomagnetic storms.

Quiescent filaments have been believed to belong to a magnetic trough, which can disappear due to the field's reconfiguration. When this happens, the filamentary material is said to be thrown into the corona, creating a typical solar flare. Hyder explains that the process for Hyder flares differs, in that sometimes the filamentary material instead cascades down the outer sides of the elevated magnetic trough, or ridge, to interact with the lower chromospheric material that is producing the flare. If this falling process is not symmetrical on either side, then there will be a double parallel ribbon shape form, whereas a symmetrical fall will produce only a single parallel ribbon. A sporadic or insufficient fall of filamentary material will cause bright knots of solar flares to be produced.

== History ==
Hyder flares were first observed by Max Waldmeier in 1938, who wrote a paper describing the phenomenon of suddenly disappearing filaments (disparition brusque), and mentioned that these can be associated with flare-like brightenings. Subsequent research wasn't completed until Charles Hyder published two papers in 1967 with the journal Solar Physics in which a proposed mechanism underlying Hyder flares was discussed in detail.

The Hyder mechanism immediately came into controversy, most notably by Harold Zirin. Zirin questioned the filament falling down the side of the magnetic ridge, stating that magnetic reconfigurations will always create ejection. Comparisons to Hyder's 1968 publications were discussed in Harold Zirin and D. Russo Lackner's Volume 6, Issue 1 of Solar Physics pages 86–103: The Solar Flares of August 28 and 30, 1996.

== Occurrences ==
As Hyder flares are notably rare, few occurrences have been recorded since their discovery. The most notable event took place between 0400 and 0600 UTC on November 1, 2014 and was defined as a C-Class flare. Scientists noted that the eruption caused plasma to be accelerated towards the Sun, which then caused several flashes of X-rays upon impact. The remaining plasma was ejected out into interplanetary space and formed a large core of coronal mass ejection.

== Hazards ==
Hyder flares are generally lower in intensity relative to active region flares, and it is commonly accepted that they pose no immediate threat to Earth. These flares can potentially affect space weather, however, which could disrupt electronics. Because of this, many precautions must be taken to prevent damages to airplane navigation and/or government technologies.
