= Bart De Pontieu =

Bart De Pontieu is a solar physicist who works at Lockheed Martin's Solar & Astrophysics Laboratory. He is known for his work on the dynamics and heating of the solar chromosphere, transition region and corona, via both wave mechanisms and nanoflares. De Pontieu has had a major role in multiple solar scientific space missions, including TRACE, Hinode, the Solar Dynamics Observatory, and IRIS. He is the Principal Investigator of the in-development Multi-slit Solar Explorer selected by NASA in February 2022.

De Pontieu is a member of the American Astronomical Society and its Solar Physics Division, as well as the American Geophysical Union and the Belgian Astronomical Society (Vereniging voor Sterrenkunde). He was elected to the Norwegian Academy of Science and Letters in 2018.

== Education ==
- M.Sc., Physics/Electrotechnical Engineering, University of Ghent, Belgium, 1992
- Ph.D., Physics, Max Planck Institute for Extraterrestrial Physics (Germany) and University of Ghent (Belgium), 1996
