= Spicule =

Spicules are any of various small needle-like anatomical structures occurring in organisms

Spicule may also refer to:

- Spicule (sponge), small skeletal elements of sea sponges
- Spicule (nematode), reproductive structures found in male nematodes (roundworms)
- Spicule (solar physics), jets of solar material from the Sun

== See also ==
- Ossicle, any various small bones
- Process (anatomy), any outgrowths of tissue
- Sclerite, hardened body parts of invertebrates
- Spikelet, the inflorescence of grasses
- Stylet (anatomy), a piercing structure
- Tubercle, wart-shaped outgrowths of body tissue
