= Erich Rieger =

German astrophysicist (1935–2021)

- Born: 1 October 1935; Gauting, Germany
- Died: 14 August 2021 (aged 85)
- Citizenship: Germany
- Education: Ph.D. (Technical University of Munich)
- Known for: Rieger periodicities
- Scientific career
- Fields: Astrophysics, Heliophysics, Geophysics
- Workplaces: Max Planck Institute for Extraterrestrial Physics (Garching, Germany)
- Thesis: Interpretation of the sintering processes in thorium powder compacts (1962)

Erich Rieger (1 October 1935 – 14 August 2021) was a German astrophysicist who spent his research career at the Max Planck Institute for Extraterrestrial Physics (MPE) near Munich. He is notable for his 1984 discovery of the period of ~154 days in solar flares. Since the discovery, the period has been confirmed in most heliophysics data in the Solar System, including the interplanetary magnetic field, and has become known as the Rieger period (P_{R}). Rieger died on 14 August 2021, at the age of 85.

== Rieger periodicities ==
=== Rieger period ===
Rieger and coworkers discovered in 1984 a strong period of ~154 days in hard solar flares, at least since the solar cycle 19. The period has since been confirmed in most heliophysics data and the interplanetary magnetic field, and is commonly known as the Rieger period.

=== Rieger-type periodicities ===
Besides numerous confirmations of P_{R}, its resonance harmonics were reported as well, including 5/6P_{R}, 2/3P_{R}, 1/2P_{R}, 1/3P_{R}, and 1/5P_{R}, i.e., ~128, ~102, ~78, ~51, and ~31 days, called Rieger-type periodicities. Types of data periodic with Rieger cycles include solar flares, photospheric magnetic flux, group sunspot numbers, and proton speed. Various longer (1–2 years) modulations also were reported in almost all heliophysics data types. Besides the above mentioned, data types that exhibit long-periodic dynamics include solar flare index, solar radio flux, and others, except for the coronal index and 10.7 cm solar flux.

So far, these periodicities have been reported in different ranges, depending on data, location, epoch, and methodology, as 155–160 days, 160–165 days, 175–188 days, and 180–190 days. Most of those studies indicate a leading periodicity ranging from 152 to 158 days, which appears to be dominant particularly in the time phase from ~1979–1983, corresponding to the solar maximum activity.

=== Origin of Rieger resonance ===
Various proposals exist as to the origin of the underlying resonant process behind P_{R} in the dynamics of Sun-ejected particles and its modulations and harmonics, including possible influences of planetary constellations on the Sun. One such report found that a damped periodically forced nonlinear oscillator, which exhibits both periodic and chaotic behavior, can simulate the process described by Rieger periodicities. The entire Rieger resonance was detected in the interplanetary magnetic field as well, including Earth's vicinity.

== Other work ==
=== High-energy solar flares ===
In 1989, Rieger provided strong evidence that flares with emissions >10 MeV are visible only near the solar limb. Gamma-ray-emitting flares are observed from sites located predominantly near the limb of the Sun; this effect was observed for flares detected at energies >0.3 MeV, but it is at energies >10 MeV that the effect is particularly pronounced. Since in both of these cases the bulk of the emission is bremsstrahlung from primary electrons, these results imply that the radiating electrons are anisotropic. Thus, the anisotropy could result from the mirroring of the charged particles in the convergent chromospheric magnetic fields.

The emissions are strongly anisotropic, with more emission in the directions tangential to the photosphere than in directions away from the Sun. In order to account for the anisotropy of the gamma-ray emission from high energy solar flares, invoked are electron transport in the coronal region and magnetic mirroring of converging magnetic flux tubes beneath the solar transition region. As the gaseous models of the Sun cannot support the existence of a real surface, another mechanism must act as a surface.

=== Artificial comet ===
Rieger was involved in the MPE early research initiatives, including the first artificial comet, created by a cloud of barium ions, and which was released by the German IRM (Ion Release Module) satellite in 1985.
