= Solar facula =

Photospheric phenomenon

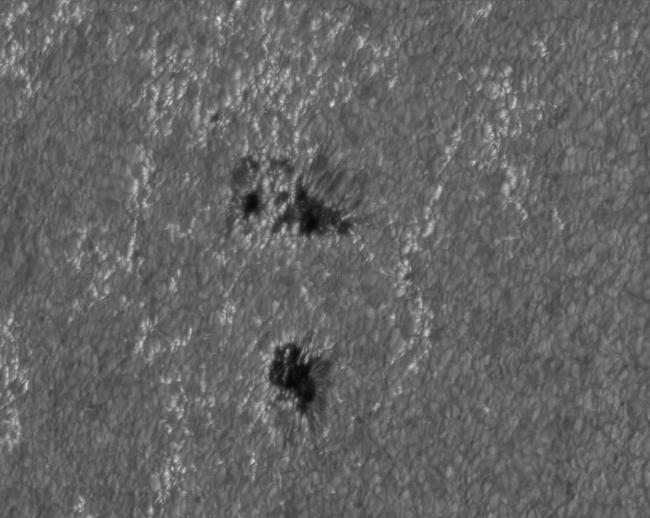
Sun's faculae. Dark regions are sunspots and the brighter speckled regions around them are faculae.

Solar faculae are bright spots in the photosphere that form in the canyons between solar granules, short-lived convection cells several thousand kilometers across that constantly form and dissipate over timescales of several minutes.

Faculae are produced by concentrations of magnetic field lines. Strong concentrations of faculae appear during increased solar activity, with or without sunspots. Faculae and sunspots contribute noticeably to variations in the solar constant. The chromospheric counterpart of a facular region is called a plage.
