= Magnetogram =

Magnetogram may refer to:

- Solar magnetogram, a pictorial representation of the spatial variations in strength of the solar magnetic field produced by a solar magnetograph
- Survey magnetogram, a pictorial representation of the time-variation in the geomagnetic field produced by a survey magnetograph
