= Active region =

Temporary region on the Sun

In solar physics, an active region is a temporary feature in the Sun's atmosphere characterized by a strong and complex magnetic field. Active regions are often associated with sunspots and are commonly the source of violent eruptions such as coronal mass ejections and solar flares. The number and location of active regions on the solar disk at any given time is dependent on the solar cycle.

The clearest definition of a solar active region is via its photospheric magnetic field; on a global magnetogram the active regions appear as complex bipolar structures. In the photosphere an active region consists of sunspots and faculae, and in the chromosphere, solar plages and an enhanced emission network that scales with the supergranulation. They typically persist for many solar rotations (months), following a relatively rapid initial growth. The strongest regions develop sunspots relatively early in their lifetime, but these normally decay and seldom persist for more than a single rotation.

== Region numbers ==
Newly observed active regions on the solar disk are assigned 4-digit region numbers by the Space Weather Prediction Center (SWPC) on the day following the initial observation. The region number assigned to a particular active region is one added to the previously assigned number. For example, the first observation of active region 8090, or AR8090, was followed by AR8091.

According to the SWPC, a number is assigned to a region if it meets at least one of the following criteria:

1. It contains a sunspot group of class C or larger based on the Modified Zurich Class sunspot classification system.
2. It contains a sunspot group of class A or B confirmed by at least two observers, preferably with observations more than one hour apart.
3. It has produced a solar flare with an X-ray burst.
4. It contains plage with a white-light brightness of at least 2.5 (on a linear scale 1-5, 5=flare) and has an extent of at least five heliographic degrees.
5. It contains plage that is bright near the west limb and is suspected of growing.

The region numbers reached 10,000 in July 2002. However, the SWPC continued using 4-digits, with the inclusion of leading zeros.

== Magnetic field ==
Examples of Hale magnetic classifications observed by SDO/HMI. From left to right: α (unipolar), β (bipolar with clear division), βγ (bipolar complex), βδ, and βγδ. Red and blue contours indicate opposite magnetic polarities.

A highly simplified diagram of the magnetic field of an active region illustrating its bipolar nature.

=== Mount Wilson magnetic classification ===
The Mount Wilson magnetic classification system, also known as the Hale magnetic classification system, is a method of classifying the magnetic field of active regions. It was first introduced in 1919 by George Ellery Hale and coworkers working at the Mount Wilson Observatory. It originally included only the α, β, and γ magnetic classifications, but it was later modified by H. Künzel in 1965 to include the δ qualifier.

Classification	Description
α	An active region containing a single sunspot or group of sunspots all having the same magnetic polarity. An opposite polarity counterpart is still present, but is weak or not concentrated enough to form sunspots.
β	An active region with at least two sunspots or sunspot groups that have opposite magnetic polarity. A simple neutral line between the two polarities is also present.
γ	An active region with sunspots having completely intermixed magnetic polarity.
β-γ	An active region with at least two sunspots or sunspot groups that have opposite magnetic polarity (hence β) but no well-defined neutral line dividing the opposite polarities (hence γ).
δ	A qualifier to the other classes indicating the presence of opposite polarity umbrae within a single penumbra separated by at most 2° in heliographic distance.
β-δ	An active region with a β magnetic field and at least one pair of opposite polarity umbrae within a single penumbra (hence δ).
β-γ-δ	An active region with a β-γ magnetic field and at least one pair of opposite polarity umbrae within a single penumbra (hence δ).
γ-δ	An active region with a γ magnetic field and at least one pair of opposite polarity umbrae within a single penumbra (hence δ).

== Coronal Field Connectivity ==
A solar active region can have on of two distinct magnetic connectivities, "streamer" or "pseudostreamer." The former is a simple bipolar configuration, extending into the upper corona and solar wind as the heliospheric current sheet. In the latter, termed a "rosette" or "anemone", unipolar large-scale field confines the active-region field, leading to "spine-and-fan" magnetic reconnection and characteristic flare patterns.

== Sunspots ==
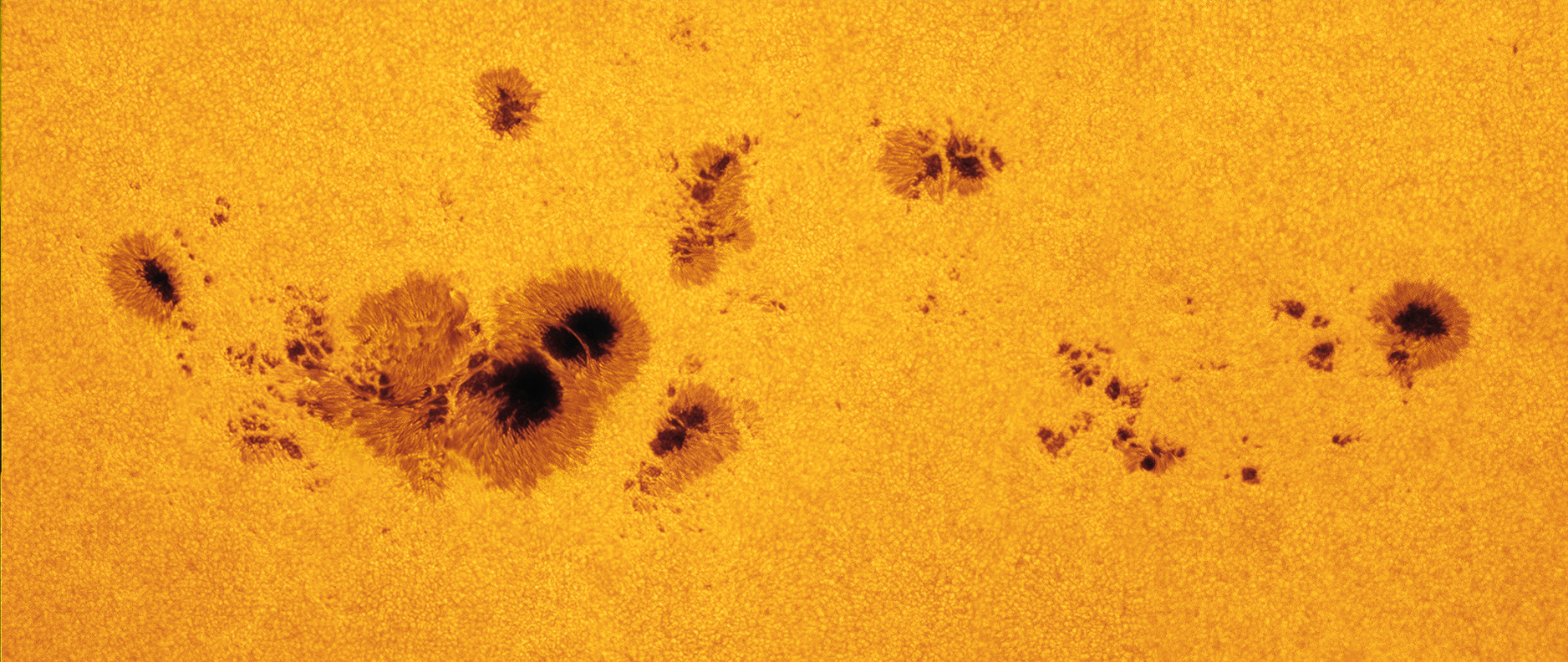
An active region seen in visible light showing a group of sunspots.

The evolution of a group of sunspots in time.

The strong magnetic flux found in active regions is often strong enough to inhibit convection. Without convection transporting energy from the Sun's interior to the photosphere, surface temperature decreases along with the intensity of emitted black body radiation. These areas of cooler plasma are known as sunspots, and often appear in groups. However, not all active regions possess sunspots.

== Magnetic flux emergence ==
Active regions form through the process of magnetic flux emergence, during which magnetic fields generated by the solar dynamo emerge from the solar interior.

== Upflow region ==
Analysis of Doppler velocity maps from the Hinode/EIS instrument, which observe the solar corona in specific spectral lines like FeXII, shows that at the edges of active regions on the Sun, there are always areas where plasma (hot, ionized gas) flows upward from the corona. These upward flows appear as blue-shifts in the Doppler velocity images. These regions of upflow are located where the Sun’s magnetic field lines are open—meaning they extend outward into space—and this connection seems to help drive the upflows.

The upflow regions could be the sources of the slow solar wind, a stream of charged particles that flows constantly from the Sun into space. The upflow areas tend to form early in the development of an active region and persist throughout its lifetime.

However, the exact reasons why these upflows occur are still not fully understood. Several hypothesis are being explored, such as waves traveling through the corona or magnetic reconnection—where magnetic field lines break and reconnect—in the active region’s core with open magnetic field lines. It’s also possible that multiple processes work together to create these upward flows at the same time.

== See also ==
- List of solar cycles
- List of solar storms
- Hyder flare
- Magnetic cloud
- Orbiting Solar Observatory
- Phoebus group, international scientists aiming at detecting solar g modes
- Solar and Heliospheric Observatory
