= Charles Hyder =

American astrophysicist and dissident

- Born: Charles Latif Hyder; 18 April 1930; Albuquerque, New Mexico, U.S.
- Died: 8 June 2004 (aged 74); Las Palomas, New Mexico
- Education: University of New Mexico
- Known for: Hunger strike, opposition to nuclear power
- Scientific career
- Fields: Astrophysics

Charles Latif Hyder (April 18, 1930 – June 8, 2004) was an American astrophysicist and dissident from Albuquerque, New Mexico, who campaigned against arms race, nuclear weapons and nuclear waste, and ran for the U.S. presidency. Media coverage of his hunger strike by the Communist press and television was seen as a Cold War retaliation to Andrei Sakharov, a Soviet scientist whose protest in turn was rallied by the Western media but received little or no coverage in the Soviet Bloc. By the end of his strike Hyder achieved superstar status in the USSR and the allied socialist countries (parallel only to Angela Davis, Dean Reed, and Samantha Smith before him), his name became nearly symbolic behind the Iron Curtain, though he remained little known in the United States, and apart from his wartime tour of duty never traveled outside the U.S.

== Biography ==
Hyder was born in Albuquerque, New Mexico, in 1930. After graduating from Albuquerque High School, he served in the United States Air Force during the Korean War.

Hyder attended the University of New Mexico, graduating with bachelor's (1958) and master's (1960) degrees in physics. In 1964, he received a doctorate in astrophysics from the University of Colorado. Through the 1970s and 1980s, he was involved in various scientific activities in the field of solar physics, publishing more than 50 works, and was also involved in NASA's Solar Maximum Mission satellite.

Hyder was married twice and had four children.

== Activism ==
Hyder was most noted for his strong anti-nuclear stance, as well as for hunger strikes which he used to advocate his causes. Age 56, he began a supposed 218-day hunger strike on September 23, 1986, near the White House in Washington, demanding that Ronald Reagan stop the arms race and eliminate the use of nuclear weapons.

Hyder's strike place was visited by a movie star Charlie Sheen, Congresswoman Barbara Boxer, as well as by his University students and colleagues. All visitors praised his dedication and determination, but begged to stop the strike for health-related concerns. U.S. Senator Tom Harkin spoke in support of Hyder's action, though he said he is "not sure that his [Hyder's] death could contribute for the world peace as much as his life and work could."

In the Soviet Union, Hyder was a regular participant in the broadcast program Vremya ('Time'). A commemorative medal was minted in his honor. A lot of collective letters, briefly summarized as "Save Doctor Hyder," were sent to Ronald Reagan by various Soviet worker assemblies. Soviet President Mikhail Gorbachev wrote a letter to Hyder, asking him to stop the strike and move to Moscow to continue his scientific work in the USSR. Hyder accepted only the first of Gorbachev's proposals. On the 218th day of the strike, frustrated and thinking that the U.S. President ignores him, Hyder went to a nearby restaurant and ordered dinner, thus ending the strike. When the hunger strike ended, Soviet punk rock band Nol ('Zero') composed a satirical song entitled "Доктор Хайдер" ("Dr. Hyder"), with its refrain meaning "Dr. Hyder has started to eat again!"

== Controversy ==
In the US, Hyder's hunger strike did not attract much attention. Furthermore, the astrophysicist was not always present at the White House. The Russian Gosteleradio (government broadcasting) correspondent in Washington, Vladimir Dunaev, introduced and explained the scientist's story to the Russian audience. Dunaev's son later revealed that to make the hunger strike look continuous, Dunaev would shoot five stories in succession every day, asking Dr. Hyder to change into different suits and ties.

According to Dunaev, Hyder was advised by doctors to diet, as his weight openly threatened his health. During the hunger strike he lost almost half of his weight of 300 pounds. It was later revealed that Hyder drank fruit juice and took vitamins during the hunger strike. According to the most skeptical physicians, he fasted only in the daytime.

After the end of the hunger strike, Hyder ran for president. He also subsequently accused the USSR of environmental pollution, after which Russian news agencies stopped reporting about him in the USSR. In 1999, he published the book "Human Survival on a Plutonium-Contaminated Planet," again trying to fast in order to fight against the storage of nuclear waste (Waste Isolation Pilot Plant).
