= Solar transition region =

Layer of the Sun's atmosphere

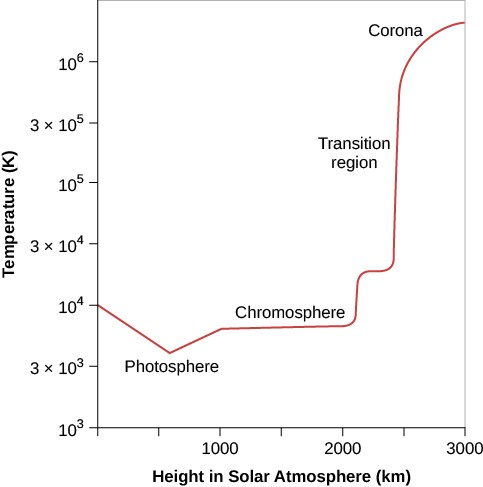
The approximate temperature in the solar atmosphere plotted against height

The solar transition region is a region of the Sun's atmosphere between the upper chromosphere and corona. It is important because it is the site of several unrelated but important transitions in the physics of the solar atmosphere:

- Below, gravity tends to dominate the shape of most features, so that the Sun may often be described in terms of layers and horizontal features (like sunspots); above, dynamic forces dominate the shape of most features, so that the transition region itself is not a well-defined layer at a particular altitude.
- Below, most of the helium is not fully ionized, so that it radiates energy very effectively; above, it becomes fully ionized. This has a profound effect on the equilibrium temperature (see below).
- Below, the material is opaque to the particular colors associated with spectral lines, so that most spectral lines formed below the transition region are absorption lines in infrared, visible light, and near ultraviolet, while most lines formed at or above the transition region are emission lines in the far ultraviolet (FUV) and X-rays. This makes radiative transfer of energy within the transition region very complicated.
- Below, gas pressure and fluid dynamics usually dominate the motion and shape of structures; above, magnetic forces dominate the motion and shape of structures, giving rise to different simplifications of magnetohydrodynamics. The transition region itself is not well studied in part because of the computational cost, uniqueness, and complexity of Navier–Stokes combined with electrodynamics.

Helium ionization is important because it is a critical part of the formation of the corona: when solar material is cool enough that the helium within it is only partially ionized (i.e. retains one of its two electrons), the material cools by radiation very effectively via both black-body radiation and direct coupling to the helium Lyman continuum. This condition holds at the top of the chromosphere, where the equilibrium temperature is a few tens of thousands of kelvins.

Applying slightly more heat causes the helium to ionize fully, at which point it ceases to couple well to the Lyman continuum and does not radiate nearly as effectively. The temperature jumps up rapidly to nearly one million kelvin, the temperature of the solar corona. This phenomenon is called the temperature catastrophe and is a phase transition analogous to boiling water to make steam; in fact, solar physicists refer to the process as evaporation by analogy to the more familiar process with water. Likewise, if the amount of heat being applied to coronal material is slightly reduced, the material very rapidly cools down past the temperature catastrophe to around one hundred thousand kelvin, and is said to have condensed. The transition region consists of material at or around this temperature catastrophe.

== See also ==
- Moreton wave
- Coronal hole
- Solar spicule
