= Solar spicule =

Jet of plasma in the Sun's chromosphere

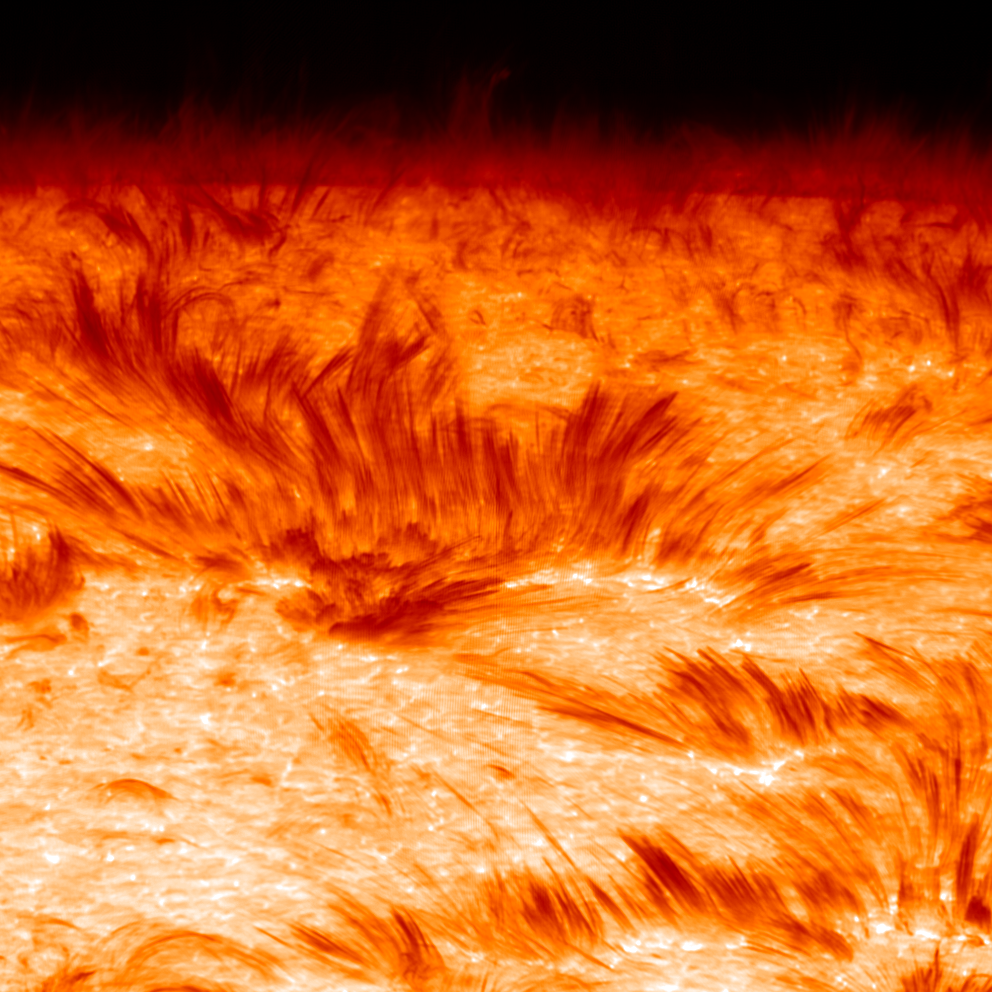
Spicules near the solar limb. They appear as dark "hairs" above the solar surface.

In solar physics, a spicule, also known as a fibril or mottle, (Note: When viewed against the background of space (off-limb), they are referred to as spicules; when viewed against the Sun's surface (on-disk), they are referred to as fibrils or mottles.) is a dynamic jet of plasma in the Sun's chromosphere about 300 km in diameter. They move upwards with speeds between 15 and 110 km/s from the photosphere and last a few minutes each before falling back to the solar atmosphere. They were discovered in 1877 by Angelo Secchi, but the physical mechanism that generates them is still hotly debated.

== Description ==
Spicules last for about 15 minutes; at the solar limb they appear elongated (if seen on the disk, they are known as "mottles" or "fibrils"). They are usually associated with regions of high magnetic flux; their mass flux is about 100 times that of the solar wind. They rise at a rate of 20 km/s (or 72,000 km/h) and can reach several thousand kilometers in height before collapsing and fading away.

== Prevalence ==
There are about 3,000,000 active spicules at any one time on the Sun's chromosphere. An individual spicule typically reaches 3,000–10,000 km altitude above the photosphere.

== Motion ==
Spicules are generally found to move in a parabolic fashion. This means that after their ejection from the solar surface at high speed they decelerate at a constant rate until they reach their maximum height (or length, as most are inclined to the vertical). They then descend back down towards the surface, accelerating at the same rate, until reaching their starting point with the same speed downwards as they originally had in the upward direction.

== Causes ==
Bart De Pontieu (Lockheed Martin Solar and Astrophysics Laboratory, Palo Alto, California, United States), Robert Erdélyi and Stewart James (both from the University of Sheffield, United Kingdom) hypothesised in 2004 that spicules form as a result of P-mode oscillations in the Sun's surface, sound waves with a period of about five minutes that causes the Sun's surface to rise and fall at several hundred meters per second (see helioseismology). Magnetic flux tubes that are tilted away from the vertical can focus and guide the rising material up into the solar atmosphere to form a spicule. However, there is still some controversy about the issue in the solar physics community.
