= Lockheed Martin Solar and Astrophysics Laboratory =

The Lockheed Martin Solar and Astrophysics Laboratory (LMSAL) is part of the Lockheed Martin Advanced Technology Center (ATC) that is known primarily for its scientific work in the field of solar physics, astronomy and space weather. The LMSAL team is part of Lockheed Martin Space Systems and has close affiliations with NASA and the solar physics group at Stanford University.

Located in Palo Alto, California, LMSAL is involved in many ground- and space-based missions that study the Sun, with a sharp focus on basic research into understanding and predicting space weather and the behavior of the Sun, including its impacts on Earth and climate.

== Space weather ==
Enormous storms on the Sun driven by electromagnetic activity generate space weather that propagates outward across the Solar System and can cause severe disturbances of Earth's upper atmosphere and of the near-Earth space environment, with potential catastrophic impacts on ground- and space-based technological infrastructure.

In October 2011 the ATC co-sponsored a workshop entitled "Space Weather Risks and Society" that brought together a broad international spectrum of experts in solar and space weather, industry, economics, regulatory bodies, and emergency management to discuss the societal impacts of space weather, how to avoid or mitigate such impacts, and how to respond to them.

An understanding of space weather and – in particular – its impacts on society are in their infancy, but there is broad agreement that societal sensitivity to high-impact, low-frequency events is obviously substantial. Equally important is the need to thoroughly investigate how space weather impacts various components of our high-tech society, and identify the mechanisms by which it does so.

== Solar missions ==
LMSAL has a 49-year-long heritage of spaceborne solar instruments including:

- 1962 to 1985 – At least 20 NASA sounding rocket flights carrying LMSAL solar and astrophysics payloads were launched.
- 1975 – The Mapping X-Ray Heliometer (MXRH) on NASA's Orbiting Solar Observatory 8 satellite
- 1980 – The X-ray polarimeter (XRP) on NASA's Solar Maximum Mission satellite
- 1985 – The Solar Optical Universal Polarimeter on STS-51F Space Shuttle mission. Dr. Loren Acton of LMSAL served as a payload specialist/astronaut on the mission and operated the instrument during two weeks in space.
- 1991 – The Soft X-ray Telescope on the Japanese Yohkoh satellite
- 1995 – The Michelson Doppler Imager on the ESA/NASA SOHO
- 1998 – The solar telescope on NASA's Transition Region and Coronal Explorer (TRACE)
- 2006 – The extreme-ultraviolet imager instruments on NASA's twin Solar Terrestrial Relations (STEREO) spacecraft
- 2006, 2009, 2010 – The Solar X-ray Imagers SXI on GOES-N, -O and –P spacecraft
- 2006 – The focal-plane package on the Japanese Hinode (Solar-B) satellite
- 2010 – The atmospheric imaging assembly and the helioseismic and magnetic imager on NASA's Solar Dynamics Observatory (SDO)
- Two of the instruments for the next generation GOES-R satellites – the Geostationary Lightning Mapper (GLM) and the Solar Ultraviolet Imager (SUVI) – are currently under construction.
- 2013 – The spacecraft and the science instrument for NASA's Interface Region Imaging Spectrograph (IRIS), a Small Explorer Mission.
