= Physical year =

Physical year may refer to:

- Fiscal year, used for calculating annual financial reports in businesses
- International Geophysical Year, an international scientific effort in 1957–1958
- International Heliophysical year, an international scientific effort in 2007–2008
