= Barbara Thompson =

Barbara Thompson may refer to:

- Barbara J. Thompson (born 1969), American heliophysicist and expert on the causes of space weather
- Barbara Thompson (figure skater), British figure skater who competed in ice dance
- Barbara Thompson (musician) (1944–2022), English jazz saxophonist, flutist and composer
- Barbara Thompson (castaway) (1831–1916), only survivor of the shipwrecked cutter America
- Barbara Thompson (politician) (1924–2010), Wisconsin Superintendent of Public Instruction
- Barbara Thompson (baseball) (1932–2020), All-American Girls Professional Baseball League player for Rockford Peaches
