= Spectrometer Telescope for Imaging X-rays =

The Spectrometer Telescope for Imaging X-rays (STIX) is one of the 10 instruments that are part of the scientific payload for the ESA Solar Orbiter mission launched in 2020.

The STIX instrument is an X-ray imaging spectrometer, whose purpose is to study the extremely hot solar plasma and the high-energy electrons accelerated during a solar flare. It can detect X-rays from 4 to 150 keV and exploits an indirect imaging technique based on the moiré effect, to produce images with few arcsec angular resolution in any given energy range.

The instrument has been developed by an international collaboration led by the University of Applied Sciences Northwestern Switzerland.
