= Solar Orbiter =

European space-based solar observatory

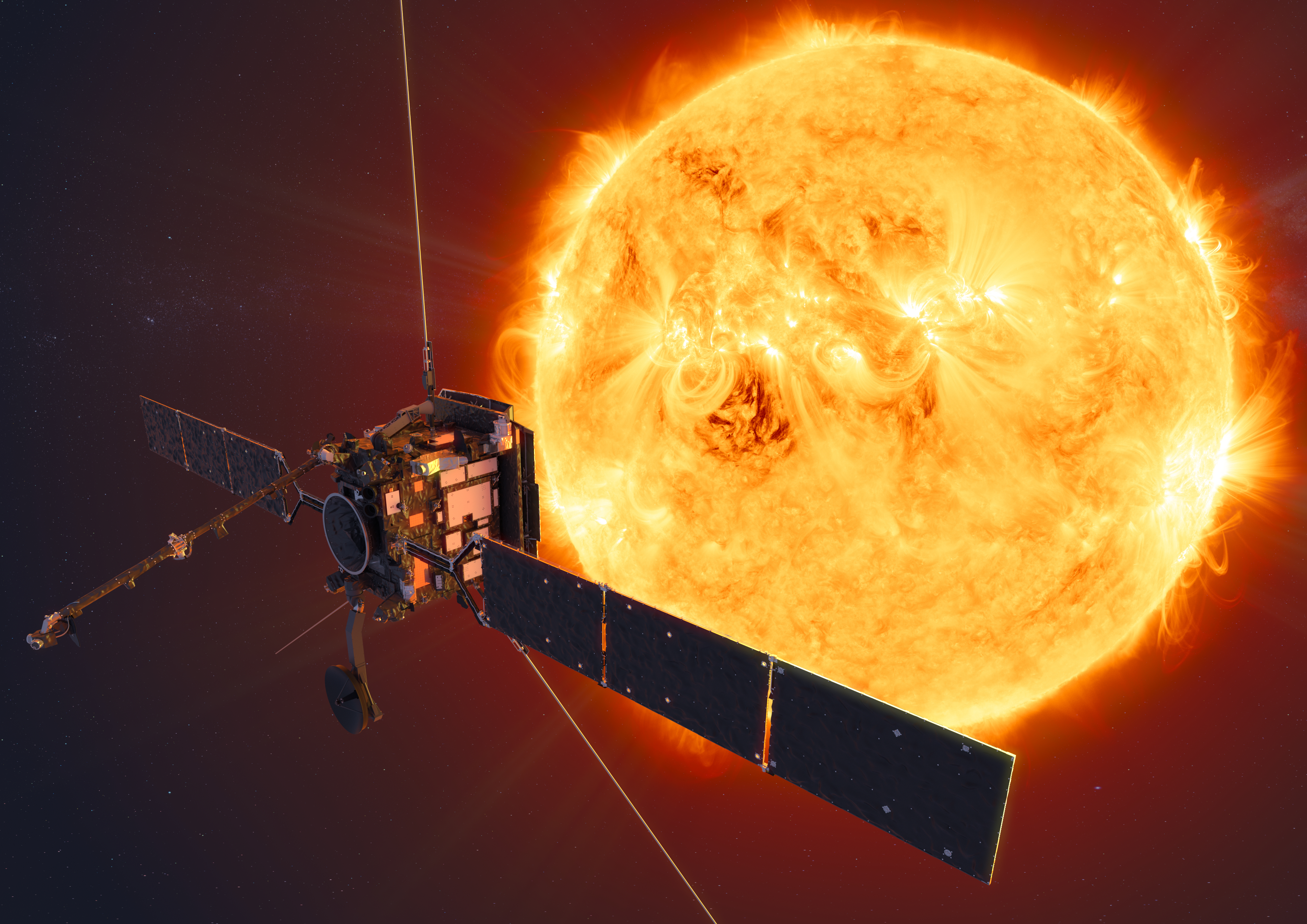
- Artist's impression of the Solar Orbiter orbiting the Sun
- Mission type: Heliophysics
- Operator: ESA / NASA
- COSPAR ID: 2020-010A
- SATCAT no.: 45167
- Website: Official website
- Mission duration: 7 years (nominal) + 3 years (extended); Elapsed: 6 years, 8 months and 30 days

Spacecraft properties
- Manufacturer: Airbus Defence and Space
- Launch mass: 1,800 kg (4,000 lb)
- Payload mass: 209 kg (461 lb)
- Dimensions: 2.5 × 3.1 × 2.7 m (8 × 10 × 9 ft)
- Power: 180 watts

Start of mission
- Launch date: 10 February 2020, 04:03 UTC
- Rocket: Atlas V 411 (AV-087)
- Launch site: Cape Canaveral, SLC‑41
- Contractor: United Launch Alliance
- Entered service: November 2021 (start of main mission)

Orbital parameters
- Reference system: Heliocentric
- Regime: Elliptic orbit
- Perihelion altitude: 0.28 AU (42 million km; 26 million mi)
- Aphelion altitude: 0.91 AU (136 million km; 85 million mi)
- Inclination: 24° (nominal mission); 33° (extended mission)
- Period: 168 days

Main telescope
- Type: Ritchey–Chrétien reflector
- Diameter: 160 mm
- Focal length: 2.5 m
- Wavelengths: Visible light, ultraviolet, X-rays
Instruments
- EPD: Energetic Particle Detector
- EUI: Extreme Ultraviolet Imager
- MAG: Magnetometer
- METIS: Multi Element Telescope for Imaging and Spectroscopy Coronagraph
- PHI: Polarimetric and Helioseismic Imager
- RPW: Radio and Plasma Waves
- SolOHI: Solar Orbiter Heliospheric Imager
- SPICE: Spectral Imaging of the Coronal Environment
- STIX: X-ray Spectrometer/Telescope
- SWPA: Solar Wind Plasma Analyser
- ESA isnignia (2020s) Cosmic Vision (Science Programme) Living With a Star program

The Solar Orbiter (SolO) is a Sun-observing probe developed by the European Space Agency (ESA) with a NASA contribution. Solar Orbiter, designed to obtain detailed measurements of the inner heliosphere and the nascent solar wind, also performs close observations of the polar regions of the Sun which is difficult to do from Earth. These observations are important in investigating how the Sun creates and controls its heliosphere.

Solar Orbiter makes observations of the Sun from an eccentric orbit moving as close as ≈60 solar radii (R_{S}), or 0.284 astronomical units (au), placing it inside Mercury's perihelion of 0.3075 au. During the mission the orbital inclination will be raised to about 24°. The total mission cost is US$1.5 billion, counting both ESA and NASA contributions. Solar Orbiter was launched on 10 February 2020 from Cape Canaveral, Florida, USA. The nominal mission is planned until the end of 2026, with a potential extension until 2030.

A comparison of the size of the Sun as seen from Earth (left, 1 au) and from the Solar Orbiter spacecraft (0.284 au, right)

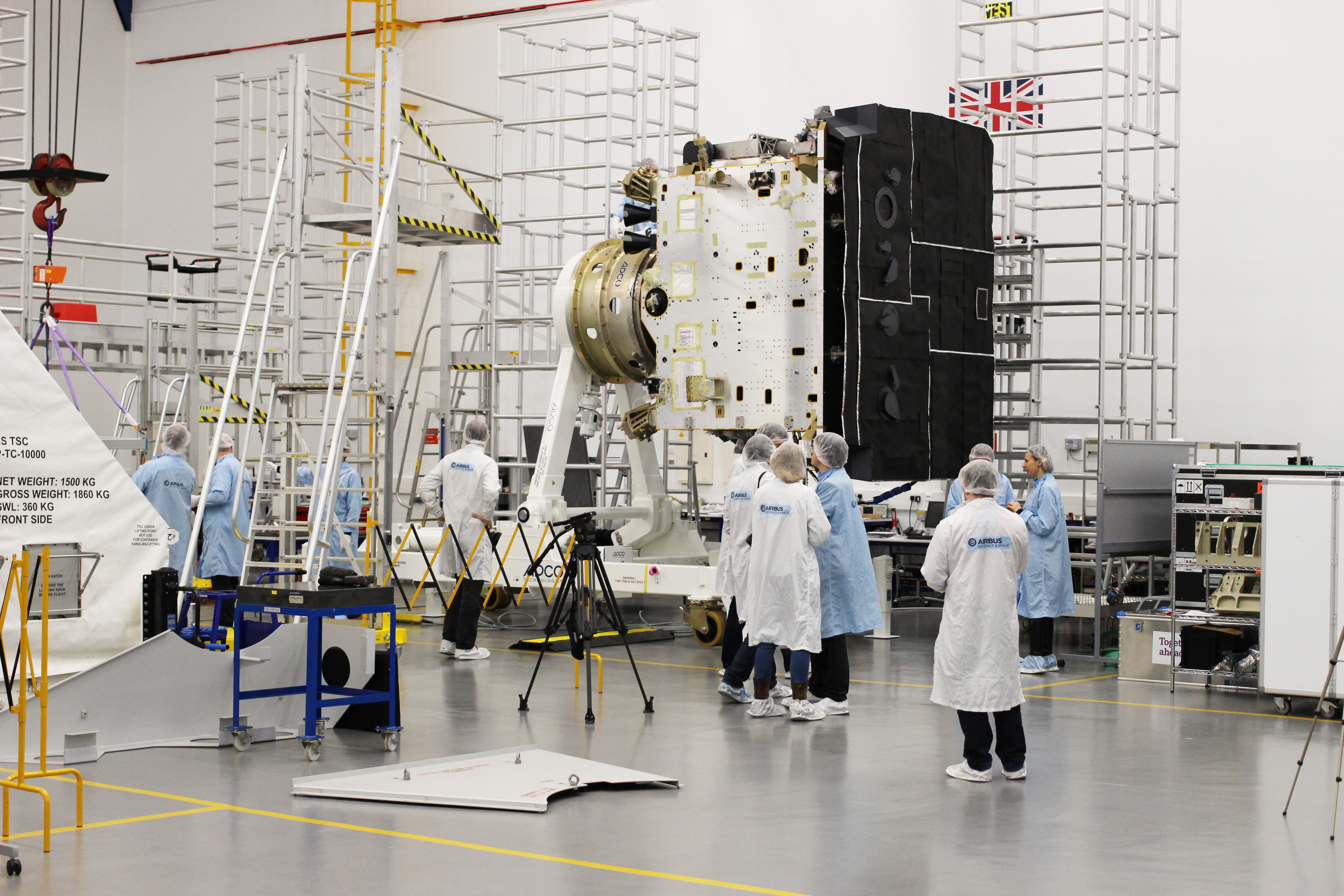
The Solar Orbiter structural thermal model shortly before leaving the Airbus Defence and Space facility in Stevenage, UK

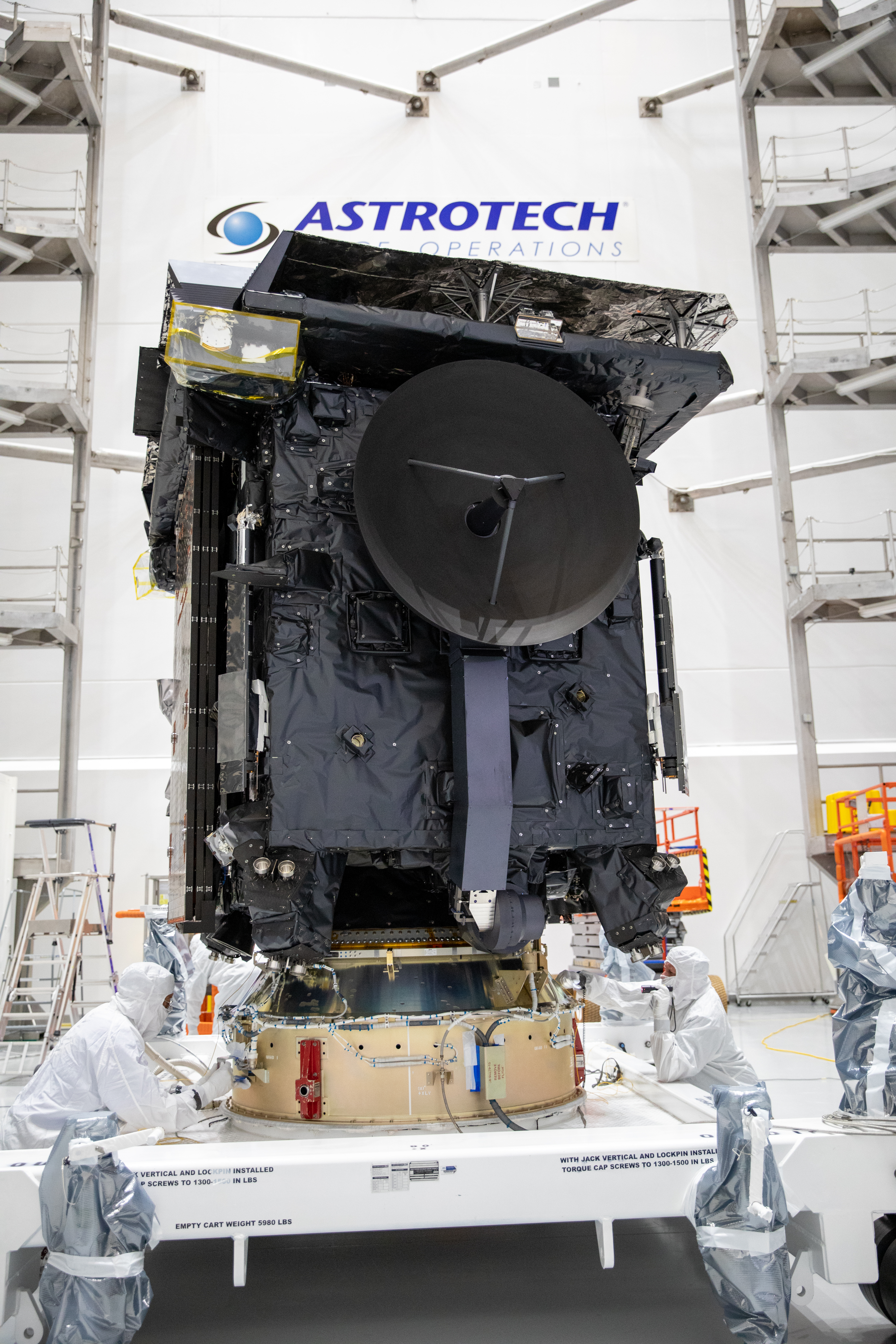
Solar Orbiter spacecraft is prepared for encapsulation in the United Launch Alliance Atlas V payload fairing.

== Mission overview ==
During the initial cruise phase, which lasted until November 2021, Solar Orbiter performed two gravity-assist manoeuvres around Venus and one around Earth to alter the spacecraft's trajectory, guiding it towards the innermost regions of the Solar System. At the same time, Solar Orbiter acquired in situ data to characterise and calibrate its remote-sensing instruments. The first close solar pass took place on 26 March 2022 at around a third of Earth's distance from the Sun.

The spacecraft's orbit has been chosen to be in resonance with Venus, which means that it will return to the planet's vicinity every few orbits and can again use the planet's gravity to alter or tilt its orbit. Initially, Solar Orbiter was confined to the same orbital plane as the planets, but each encounter of Venus will increase its orbital inclination. For example, following the 2025 Venus encounter it makes solar passes at 17° inclination, increasing to 33° during a proposed mission extension phase, bringing even more of the polar regions into direct view.

The spacecraft makes a close approach to the Sun every six months. The closest approaches are positioned to allow a repeated study of the same region of the solar atmosphere. Solar Orbiter is able to observe the magnetic activity building up in the atmosphere that can lead to powerful solar flares or eruptions.

Researchers also have the chance to coordinate observations with NASA's Parker Solar Probe mission (2018–present) which is performing measurements of the Sun's extended corona, as well as other ground-based assets such as the Daniel K. Inouye Solar Telescope.

== Objectives ==
The objective of the mission is to perform close-up, high-resolution studies of the Sun and its inner heliosphere. The new understanding will help answer these questions:

- How and where do the solar wind plasma and magnetic field originate in the corona?
- How do solar transients drive heliospheric variability?
- How do solar eruptions produce energetic particle radiation that fills the heliosphere?
- How does the solar dynamo work and drive connections between the Sun and the heliosphere?

== Spacecraft ==
The Solar Orbiter spacecraft is a Sun-pointed, three-axis stabilised platform with a dedicated heat shield to provide protection from the high levels of solar flux near perihelion. The 21 sensors were configured on the spacecraft to allow each to conduct its in-situ or remote-sensing experiments with both access to and protection from the solar environment. Solar Orbiter has inherited technology from previous missions, such as the solar arrays from ESA's BepiColombo Mercury Planetary Orbiter (MPO). The solar arrays can be rotated about their longitudinal axis to avoid overheating when close to the Sun. A battery pack provides supplementary power at other points in the mission such as eclipse periods encountered during planetary flybys.

== Communication ==
The Telemetry, Tracking, and Command Subsystem provides the communication link capability with the Earth in X-band. The subsystem supports telemetry, telecommand and ranging. Low-gain antennas are used for Launch and Early Orbit Phase (LEOP) and function as a back-up during the mission phase when steerable medium- and high-gain antennas are in use.

The High-Temperature High-Gain Antenna needs to point to a wide range of positions to achieve a link with the ground station and to be able to downlink sufficient volumes of data. Its design was adapted from the BepiColombo mission. The antenna can be folded in to gain protection from Solar Orbiter's heat shield if necessary. Most data will therefore initially be stored in on-board memory and sent back to Earth at the earliest possible opportunity.

During nominal science operations, science data is downlinked for eight hours during each communication period with the ground station. Additional eight-hour downlink passes are scheduled as needed to reach the required total science data return of the mission. The Solar Orbiter ground segment makes maximum reuse of ESA's infrastructure for Deep Space missions:

- The ground stations, which belong to ESA's space tracking station network (ESTRACK)
- The Mission Operations Centre (MOC), located at ESOC, Darmstadt, Germany
- The Science Operations Centre (SOC), located at ESAC, Villanueva de la Cañada, Spain
- The communications network, linking the various remotely located centres and stations to support the operational data traffic

The Science Operations Centre was responsible for mission planning and the generation of payload operations requests to the MOC, as well as science data archiving. The SOC has been operational for the active science phase of the mission, i.e. from the beginning of the Cruise Phase onwards. The handover of payload operations from the MOC to the SOC is performed at the end of the Near-Earth Commissioning Phase (NECP). ESA's Malargüe Station in Argentina will be used for all operations throughout the mission, with the ground stations of New Norcia Station, Australia, and Cebreros Station, Spain, acting as backup when necessary.

== Instruments ==
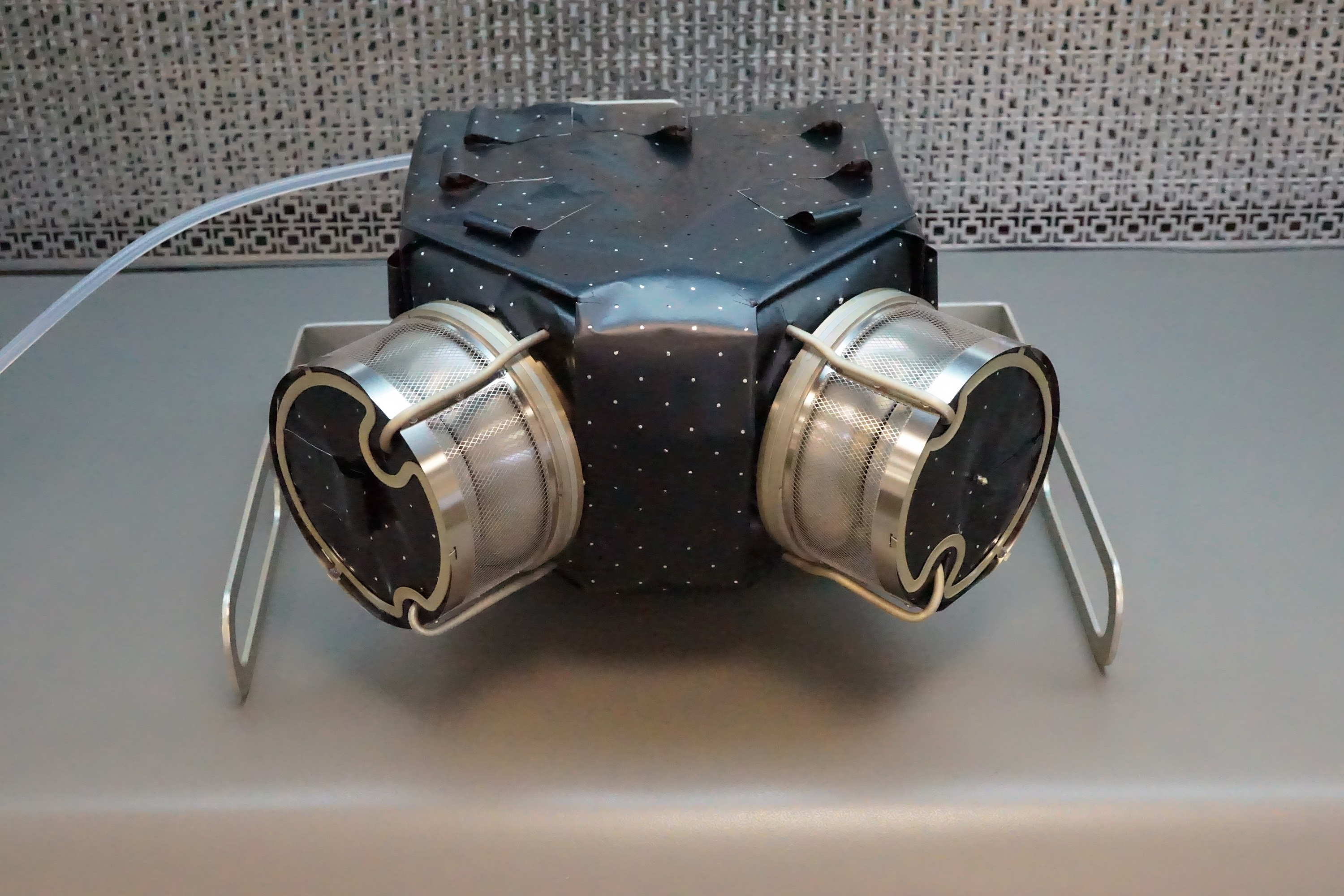
The flight model of the Electrostatic Analyser System (EAS), which is part of the Solar Wind Analyser (SWA) Suite

The science payload is composed of 10 instruments:

=== Heliospheric in-situ instruments (4) ===
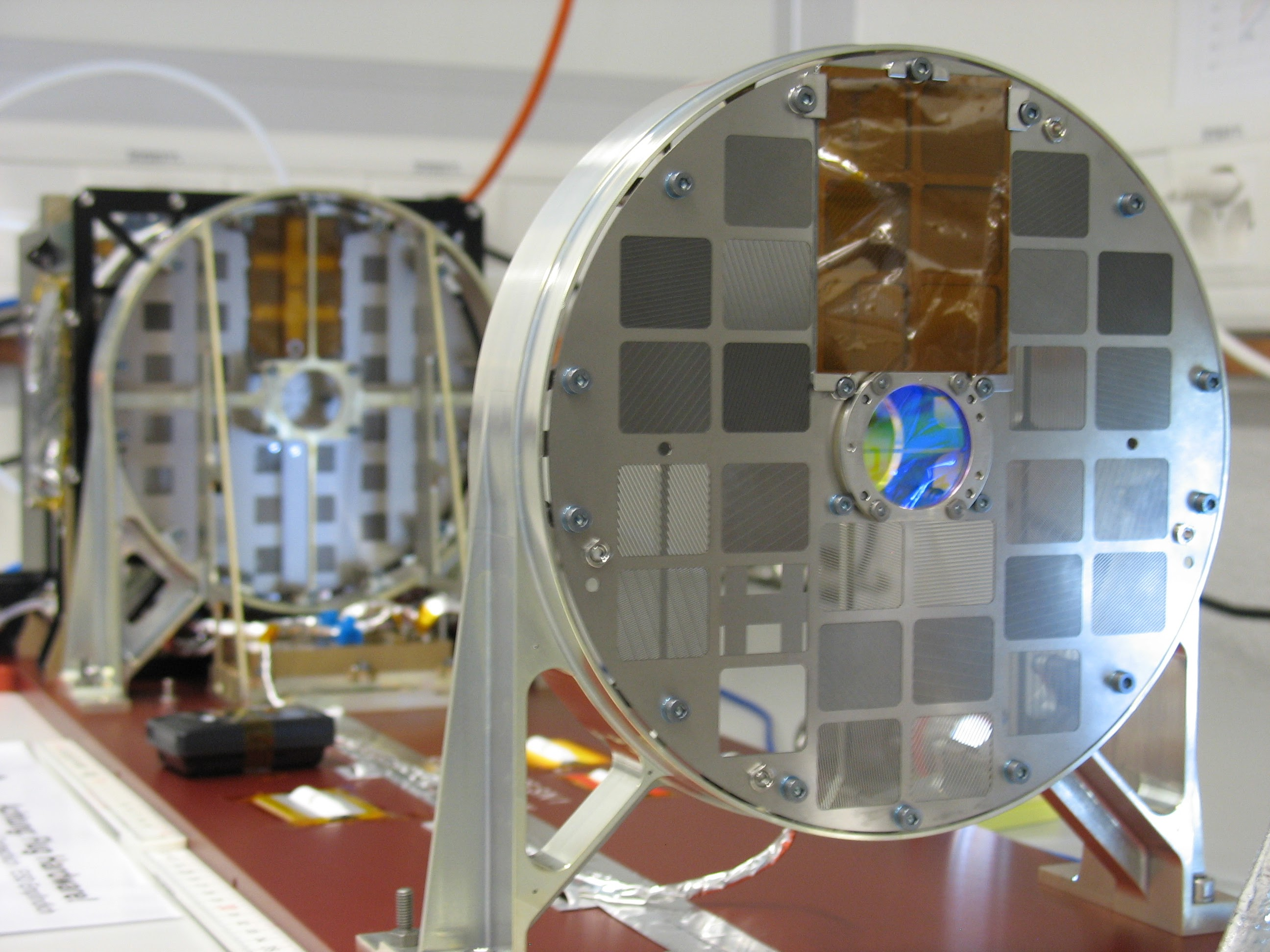
STIX

- SWA – Solar Wind Plasma Analyser (United Kingdom): Consists of a suite of sensors that measures the ion and electron bulk properties (including density, velocity, and temperature) of the solar wind, thereby characterizing the solar wind between 0.28 and 1.4 au from the Sun. In addition to determining the bulk properties of the wind, SWA provides measurements of solar wind ion composition for key elements (e.g. the C, N, O group and Fe, Si or Mg)
- EPD – Energetic Particle Detector (Spain): Measures the composition, timing and distribution functions of suprathermal and energetic particles. Scientific topics to be addressed include the sources, acceleration mechanisms, and transport processes of these particles
- MAG – Magnetometer (United Kingdom): Provides in situ measurements of the heliospheric magnetic field (up to 64 Hz) with high precision. This will facilitate detailed studies into the way the Sun's magnetic field links into space and evolves over the solar cycle; how particles are accelerated and propagate around the Solar System, including to the Earth; how the corona and solar wind are heated and accelerated
- RPW – Radio and Plasma Waves (France): Unique amongst the Solar Orbiter instruments, RPW makes both in situ and remote-sensing measurements. RPW measures magnetic and electric fields at high time resolution using a number of sensors/antennas, to determine the characteristics of electromagnetic and electrostatic waves in the solar wind

=== Solar remote-sensing instruments (6) ===
- PHI – Polarimetric and Helioseismic Imager (Germany): Provides high-resolution and full-disk measurements of the photospheric vector magnetic field and line-of-sight (LOS) velocity as well as the continuum intensity in the visible wavelength range. The LOS velocity maps have the accuracy and stability to allow detailed helioseismic investigations of the solar interior, in particular of the solar convection zone high-resolution and full-disk measurements of the photospheric magnetic field
- EUI – Extreme Ultraviolet Imager (Belgium): Images the solar atmospheric layers above the photosphere, thereby providing an indispensable link between the solar surface and outer corona that ultimately shapes the characteristics of the interplanetary medium. Also, EUI provides the first-ever UV images of the Sun from an out-of-ecliptic viewpoint (up to 33° of solar latitude during the extended mission phase)
- SPICE – Spectral Imaging of the Coronal Environment (France): Performs extreme ultraviolet imaging spectroscopy to remotely characterize plasma properties of the Sun's on-disk corona. This will enable matching in situ composition signatures of solar wind streams to their source regions on the Sun's surface
- STIX – Spectrometer Telescope for Imaging X-rays (Switzerland): Provides imaging spectroscopy of solar thermal and non-thermal X-ray emission from 4 to 150 keV. STIX provides quantitative information on the timing, location, intensity, and spectra of accelerated electrons as well as of high-temperature thermal plasmas, mostly associated with flares and/or microflares
- Metis – Coronagraph (Italy): Simultaneously images the visible and far ultraviolet emissions of the solar corona and diagnoses, with unprecedented temporal coverage and spatial resolution, the structure and dynamics of the full corona in the range from 1.4 to 3.0 (from 1.7 to 4.1) solar radii from Sun centre, at minimum (maximum) perihelion during the nominal mission. This is a region that is crucial in linking the solar atmospheric phenomena to their evolution in the inner heliosphere
- SoloHI – Solar Orbiter Heliospheric Imager (United States): Images both the quasi-steady flow and transient disturbances in the solar wind over a wide field of view by observing visible sunlight scattered by solar wind electrons. SoloHI provides unique measurements to pinpoint coronal mass ejections (CMEs). (NRL provided)

=== Institutions involved ===
The following institutions operate each instrument:

- Solar Wind Plasma Analyser (SWA): Mullard Space Science Laboratory
- Energetic Particle Detector (EPD): University of Alcala, Kiel University (CAU)
- Magnetometer (MAG): Imperial College London
- Radio and Plasma Waves (RPW): Observatoire de Paris
- Polarimetric and Helioseismic Imager (PHI): Max Planck Institute for Solar System Research (MPS), Instituto de Astrofísica de Andalucía (IAA)
- Extreme Ultraviolet Imager (EUI): Royal Observatory of Belgium, Centre Spatial de Liège, Institut d'astrophysique spatiale, Max Planck Institute for Solar System Research (MPS), Physikalisch-Meteorologisches Observatorium Davos (PMOD/WRC)
- Spectral Imaging of the Coronal Environment (SPICE): Institut d'astrophysique spatiale Rutherford Appleton Laboratory, Max Planck Institute for Solar System Research (MPS)
- Spectrometer/Telescope for Imaging X-rays (STIX): FHNW, Space Research Centre of Polish Academy of Sciences, Leibniz-Institut für Astrophysik Potsdam (AIP)
- Coronagraph (Metis): University of Florence, INAF, Max Planck Institute for Solar System Research (MPS)
- Heliospheric Imager (SoloHI): United States Naval Research Laboratory

Solar Orbiter represented, at the time of its launch, the largest contribution of Czech researchers and companies to any spaceflight project. In total, five teams from the Czech Republic took part in preparation of four of the scientific instruments.

== Mission timeline ==
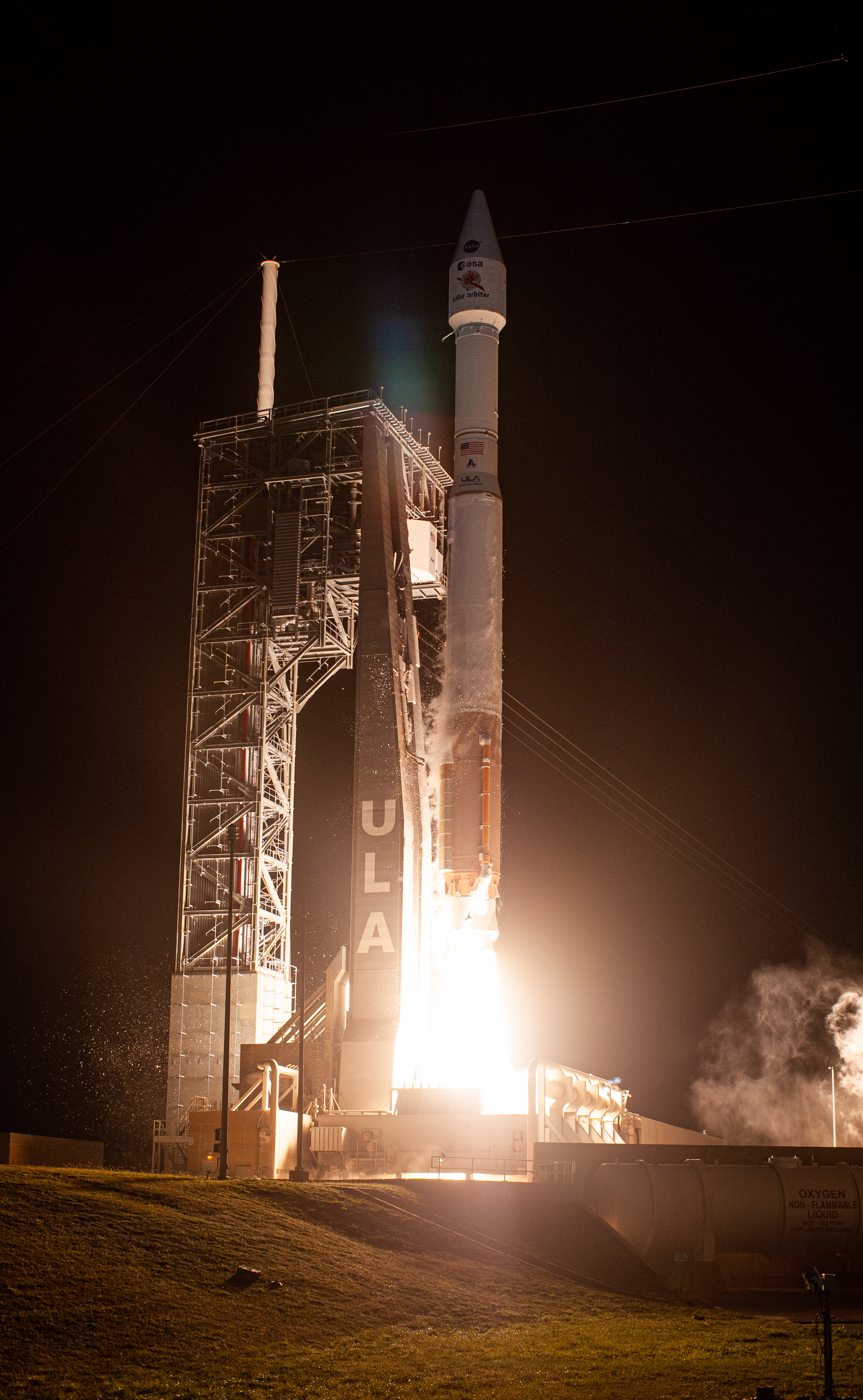
The launch of Solar Orbiter from Cape Canaveral at 11.03pm EST on 9 February 2020 (US date)

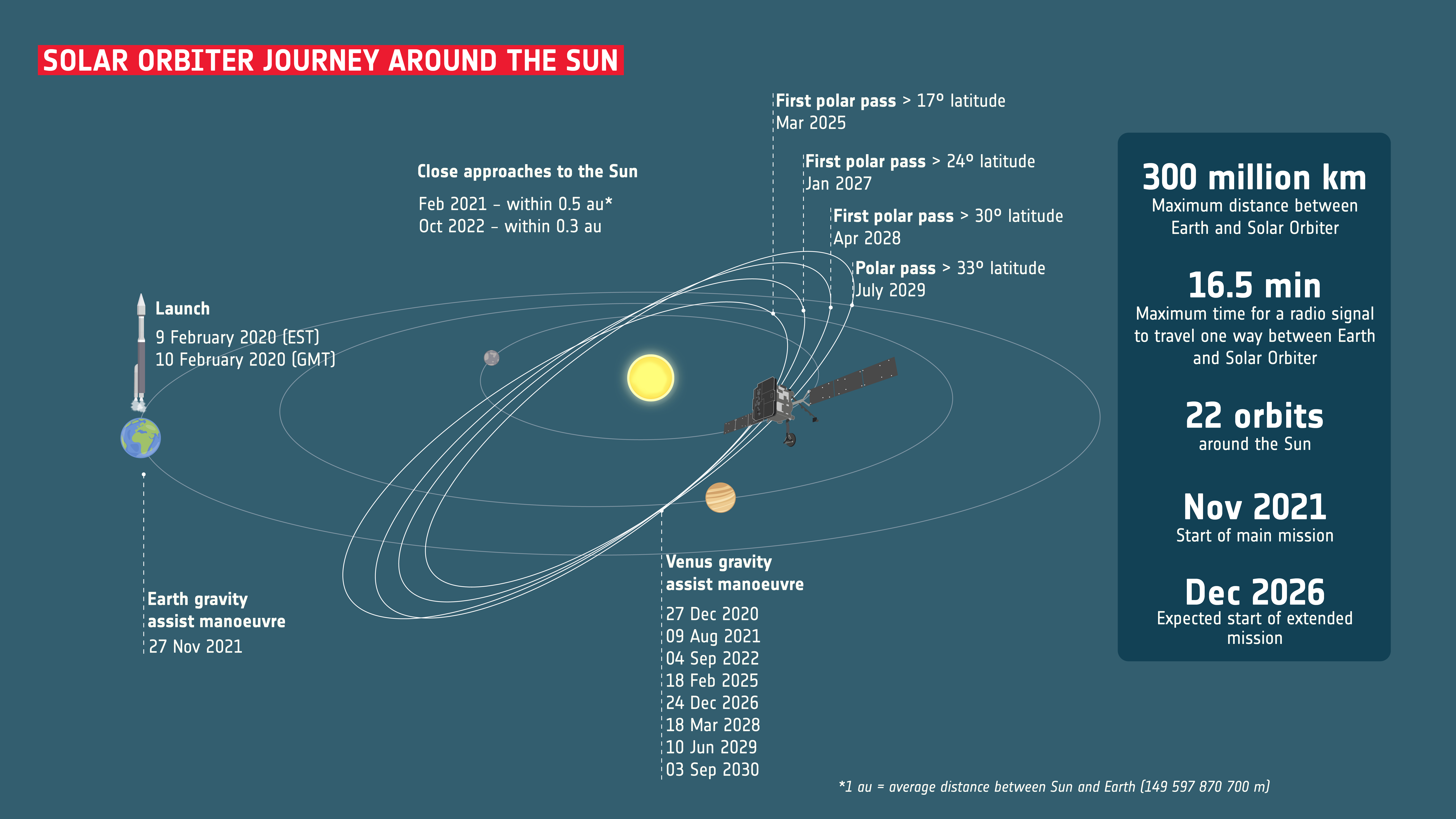
Solar Orbiter—journey around the Sun

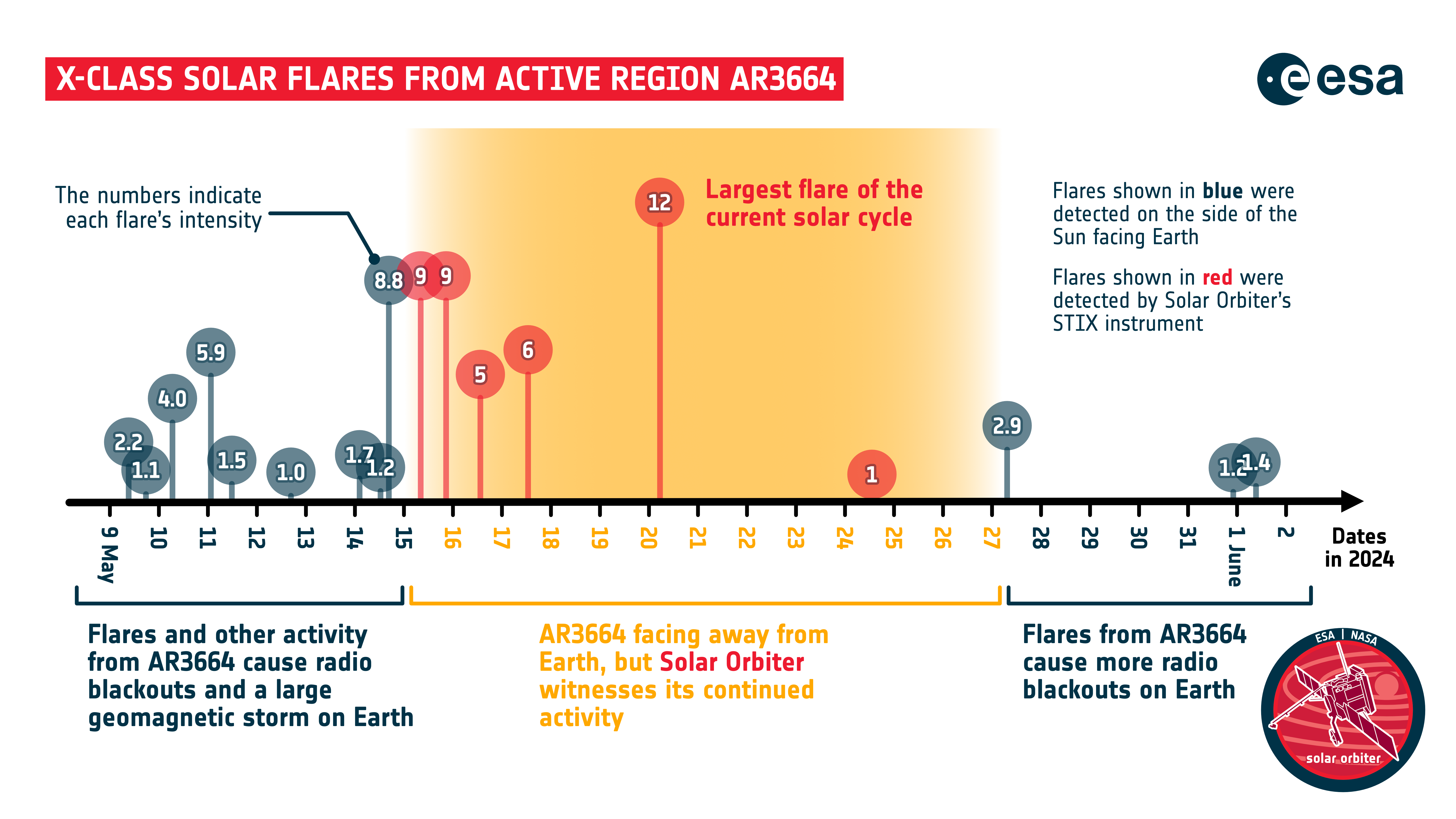
Timeline of X-class flares from active region AR3664 that caused the solar storms of May 2024

The evolution of X-ray emission during the M7.7 class solar flare recorded by Solar Orbiter on 30 September 2024

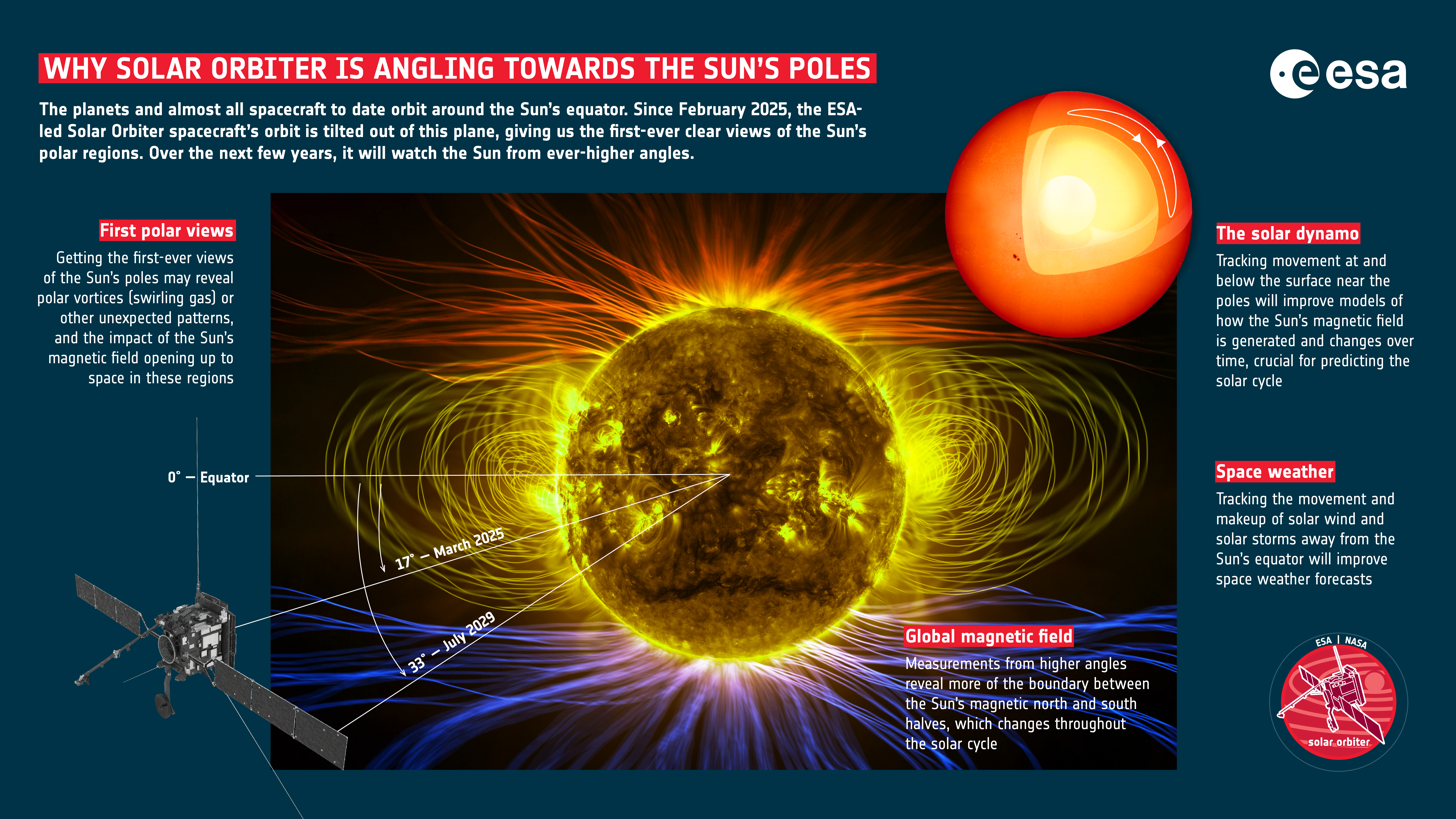
Why Solar Orbiter is angling towards the Sun's poles

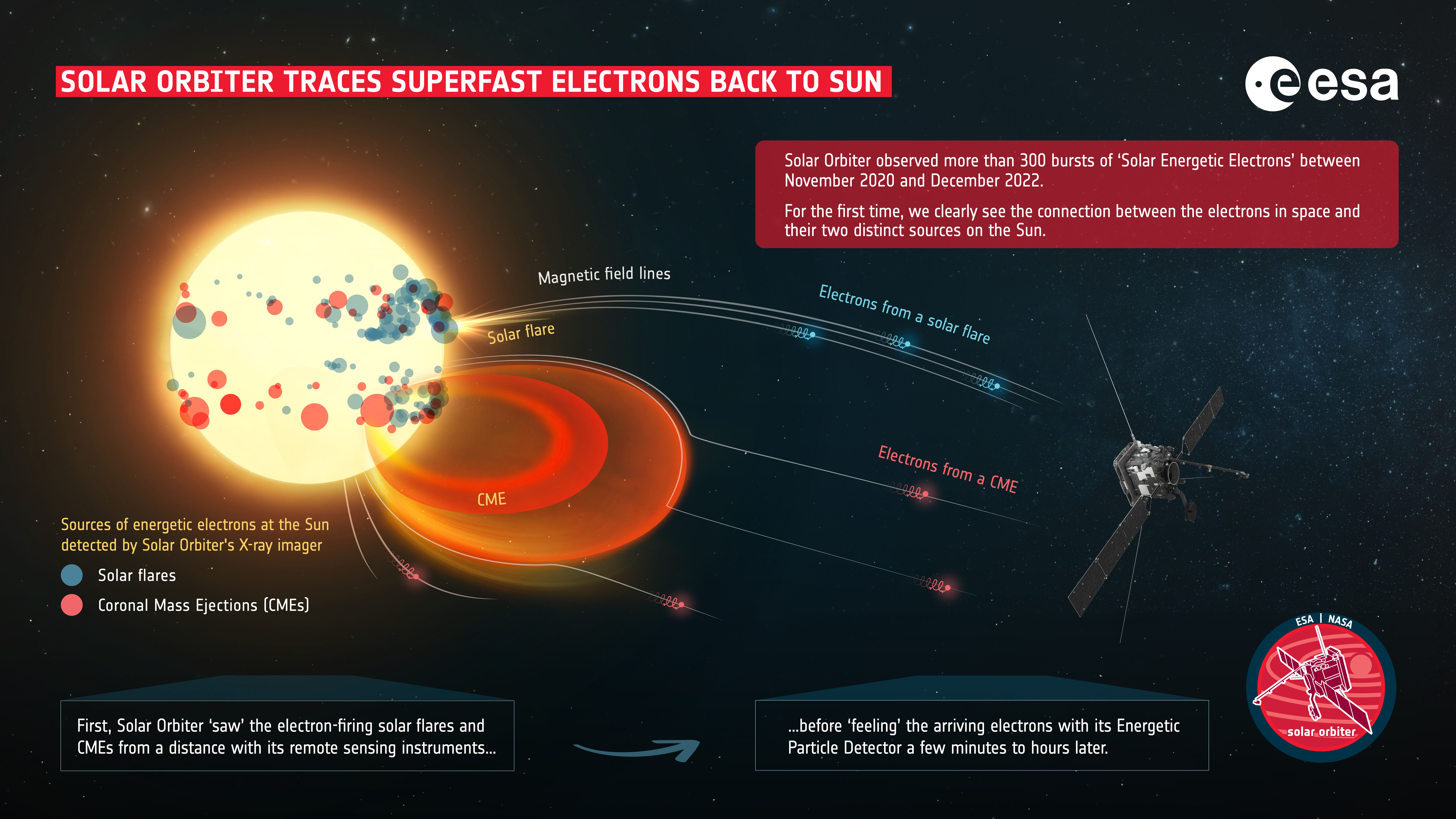
Solar Orbiter traces superfast electrons back to Sun

Extreme Ultraviolet Imager (EUI) video of the Sun from 9–12 November 2025

=== Before launch ===
The €319 million contract to build orbiter was awarded to Astrium UK in April 2012 The spacecraft's solar shield completed 2 week bake test in June 2014 In April 2015, the launch was set back from July 2017 to October 2018. In August 2017, Solar Orbiter was considered on track for a launch in February 2019. The spacecraft is shipped to IABG in Germany to begin the environmental test campaign in September 2018.

=== Launch ===
The Atlas V 411 (AV-087) lifted off from SLC-41 at Cape Canaveral, Florida, on 10 February 2020 at 04:03 UTC. The Solar Orbiter spacecraft separated from the Centaur upper stage nearly 53 minutes later, and ESA acquired the first signals from the spacecraft a few minutes later.

=== Cruise phase ===
After launch, Solar Orbiter entered the cruise phase, which lasted until late 2021. Using repeated gravity assists from Earth and Venus, the spacecraft reached its operational orbit, an elliptical orbit with perihelion 0.29 AU and aphelion 0.91 AU. The first flyby was of Venus in December 2020.

In June 2020, Solar Orbiter came within 77,000,000 km (48,000,000 mi) of the Sun, and captured the closest pictures of the Sun ever taken.

During its cruise towards Venus, Solar Orbiter passed through the ion tail of comet C/2019 Y4 (ATLAS) from 31 May to 1 June 2020. It passed through the comet's dust tail on 6 June 2020. In December 2021, it flew through the tail of comet C/2021 A1 Leonard.

In August 2021, the second Venus flyby happened only 33 hours before another interplanetary spacecraft by ESA, BepiColombo, conducted its gravity assist at the same planet. Both spacecraft used their science instruments to study the magnetic, plasma, and particle environment around Venus during their flybys, offering unique multipoint datasets. Solar Orbiter's SoloHI imager observed the nightside of Venus, surrounded by a bright crescent of the dayside, in the days before closest approach. Solar Orbiter's magnetometer observed changes in Venus's magnetic environment along the trajectory, including a sharp drop as the spacecraft crossed the bow shock.

=== Nominal mission phase ===
Over the expected mission duration of 7 years, Solar Orbiter will use additional gravity assists from Venus to raise its inclination from 0° to 24°, allowing it a better view of the Sun's poles. If an extended mission is approved, the inclination could rise further to 33°.

==== 2022 ====
The highest resolution image of the Sun's full disc and outer atmosphere, the corona, so far have been taken on 7 March 2022. In September 2022, scientists suggested a solution to the magnetic switchback mystery based on Solar Orbiter data from March 2022.

Between 18 and 24 October 2022, the first coordinated observations of the Sun by Solar Orbiter and Daniel K. Inouye Solar Telescope were performed to demonstrate how such high-resolution joint observations can help address important scientific questions in the field. Coordinated data were successfully collected at several times throughout the week, enabling studies of coronal loop physics, the formation and evolution of small-scale active region brightenings, and coronal rain dynamics.

In 2022, Solar Orbiter and Parker Solar Probe (PSP) planners collaborated to study why the Sun's atmosphere is 150 times hotter than its surface. Solar Orbiter observed the Sun from 140 million kilometers, while PSP simultaneously observed the Sun's corona from nearly 9 million kilometers.

==== 2024 ====
In March 2024, both Solar Orbiter and Parker Solar Probe (PSP) were at their closest approaches to the Sun, PSP at 7.3 million km, and Solar Orbiter at 45 million km. Solar Orbiter observed the Sun, while PSP sampled the plasma of the solar wind, allowing scientists to compare data from both probes.

In mid-May 2024, the active sunspot region AR3664 caused the biggest solar storm to hit Earth in over 20 years. Solar Orbiter was able to observe the active region in late May, when it was facing away from Earth, and documented the strongest solar flare yet of solar cycle 25 on 20 May, followed by a surge of fast ions and electrons detected by the EPD instrument. After that, the spacecraft's Metis coronagraph observed a coronal mass ejection, whose effects on the spacecraft's environment were detected by the MAG magnetometer about one day later. The solar flare of 20 May was also detected by other ESA spacecraft, BepiColombo and Mars Express, as a large increase in the number of memory errors. By combining the observations by Solar Orbiter and NASA's Solar Dynamics Observatory, scientists were able to track the active region continuously for 94 days, i.e. over three solar rotations, creating the longest such series of observations so far.

On 30 September 2024, at its ninth perihelion, Solar Orbiter observed a M7.7-class solar flare using EUI, PHI, SPICE, and STIX, which resulted in the most detailed recording of a large solar flare so far and allowed scientists to observe the build up of a "magnetic avalanche" just minutes before the flare.

==== 2025 ====
In February 2025, Solar Orbiter left the orbital plane of the solar system after successfully completing the 4th Venus flyby, tilting its orbit to 17°. On 11 June 2025, the mission's first images and videos of the Sun's south pole (taken in March 2025) were released. These are the first images of the Sun's poles taken from outside the ecliptic plane.

In September 2025, scientists published CoSEE-Cat: A Comprehensive Solar Energetic Electron event Catalogue and identified two distinct types of solar energetic electrons, one associated with intense solar flares and other with coronal mass ejections, using in situ data from Solar Orbiter.

In November 2025, scientists published first results based on the March 2025 observations of the Sun's south pole. The supergranulation data from the PHI and EUI instruments show that, contrary to expectations and previous ecliptic-plane observations, Sun's magnetic field drifts toward the poles at approximately 10 to 20 meters per second—almost as fast as it does at lower latitudes.

==== 2026 ====
ISRO and ESA conducted a workshop at IIST in Thiruvanthapuram between 19 and 23 January 2026 presenting data from Aditya-L1, Proba-3, and Solar Orbiter presenting complementary vantage data points from each mission.

Solar Orbiter's observations were used to predict what the Sun's corona would look like during the Solar eclipse of August 12, 2026.

== Trajectory ==
Animation of Solar Orbiter's trajectory

Polar view. For more detailed animation, see this video

Equatorial view

Solar Orbiter · Mercury · Venus · Earth · Sun

Date	Event	Distance from the Sun (AU) / a planet (km)	Orbital inclination
Cruise Phase
15 Jun 2020	Perihelion #1	0.52	7.7°
27 Dec 2020 12:39 UTC	Venus flyby #1	7,500	
10 Feb 2021	Perihelion #2	0.49	
09 Aug 2021 04:42 UTC	Venus flyby #2	7,995	
12 Sep 2021	Perihelion #3	0.59	
27 Nov 2021	Earth flyby	460	
Nominal Mission Phase
26 Mar 2022	Perihelion #4	0.32	
04 Sep 2022 01:26 UTC	Venus flyby #3	6,000	
12 Oct 2022	Perihelion #5	0.29	
10 Apr 2023	Perihelion #6	0.29	
07 Oct 2023	Perihelion #7	0.29	
04 Apr 2024	Perihelion #8	0.29	
30 Sep 2024	Perihelion #9	0.29	
18 Feb 2025 20:48 UTC	Venus flyby #4	379	17°
31 Mar 2025	Perihelion #10	0.29	
16 Sep 2025	Perihelion #11	0.29	
03 Mar 2026	Perihelion #12	0.29	
18 Aug 2026	Perihelion #13	0.29	
24 Dec 2026 23:04 UTC	Venus flyby #5	950	24°
Extended Mission Phase
06 Feb 2027	Perihelion #14	0.28	
06 Jul 2027	Perihelion #15	0.28	
03 Dec 2027	Perihelion #16	0.28	
18 Mar 2028 08:22 UTC	Venus flyby #6	350	33°
7 May 2028	Perihelion #17	0.33	
04 Oct 2028	Perihelion #18	0.33	
03 Mar 2029	Perihelion #19	0.33	
10 Jun 2029 17:47 UTC	Venus flyby #7	350	
11 Aug 2029	Perihelion #20	0.37	
08 Jan 2030	Perihelion #21	0.37	
03 Sep 2030 03:03 UTC	Venus flyby #8	2650	
06 Jun 2030	Perihelion #22	0.37	

The speed of the probe and distance from the Sun

== Results and updates ==
Since the launch of the mission, a series of papers have been released in three special issues of the Astronomy and Astrophysics Journal:

- The Solar Orbiter mission
- Solar Orbiter First Results (Cruise Phase)
- Solar Orbiter First Results (Nominal Mission Phase)

Meanwhile, regular "science nuggets" are released on the Solar Orbiter science community website.

Solar Orbiter news are regularly updated and listed in the official ESA public pages, as well as on the Bluesky and Twitter/X account. Images taken by the spacecraft with various instruments can be found on the official Flickr account.

== Gallery ==
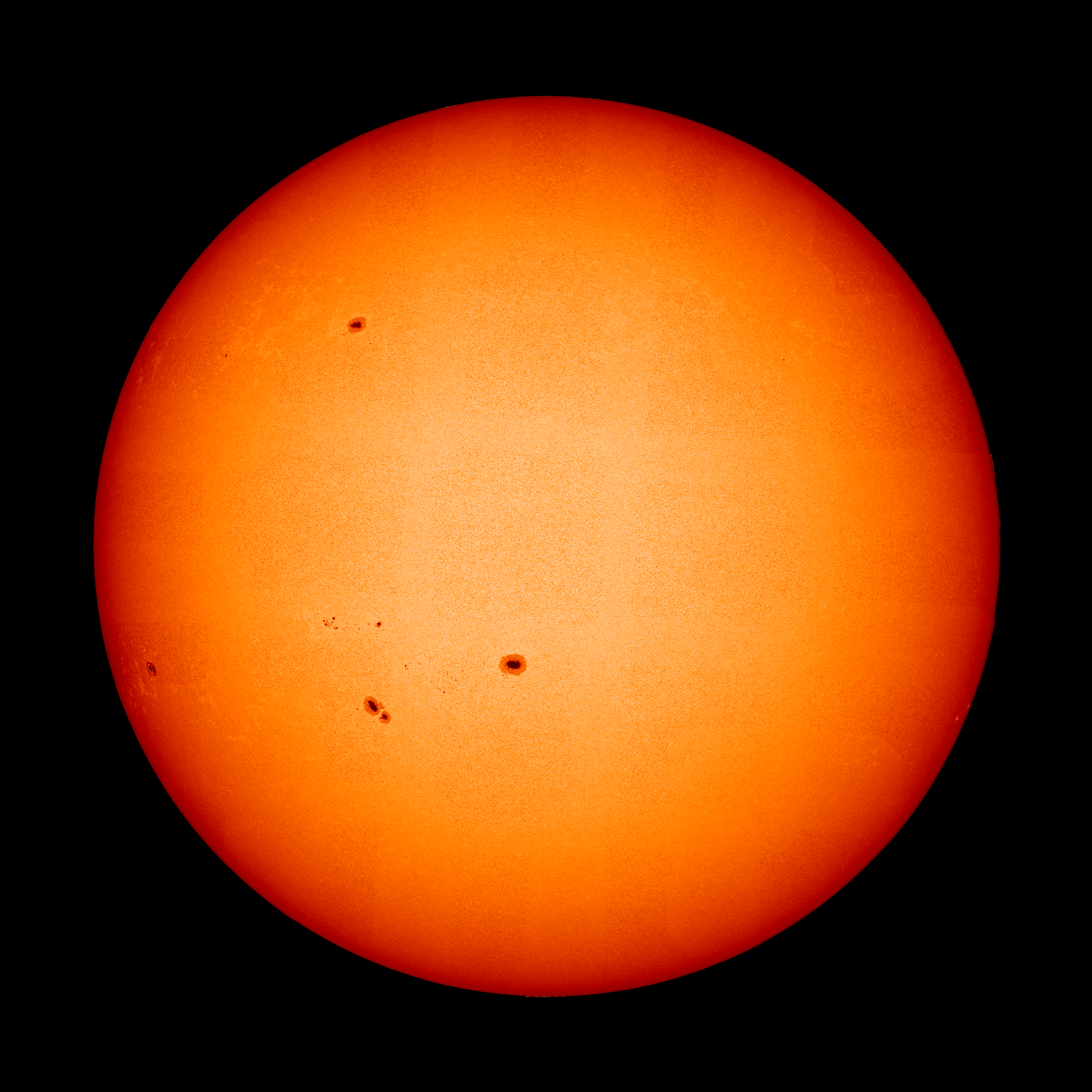
PHI's view of the Sun in visible light

EUI's view of the Sun in UV light

PHI's map of the Sun's magnetic field

PHI's velocity map of the Sun's surface

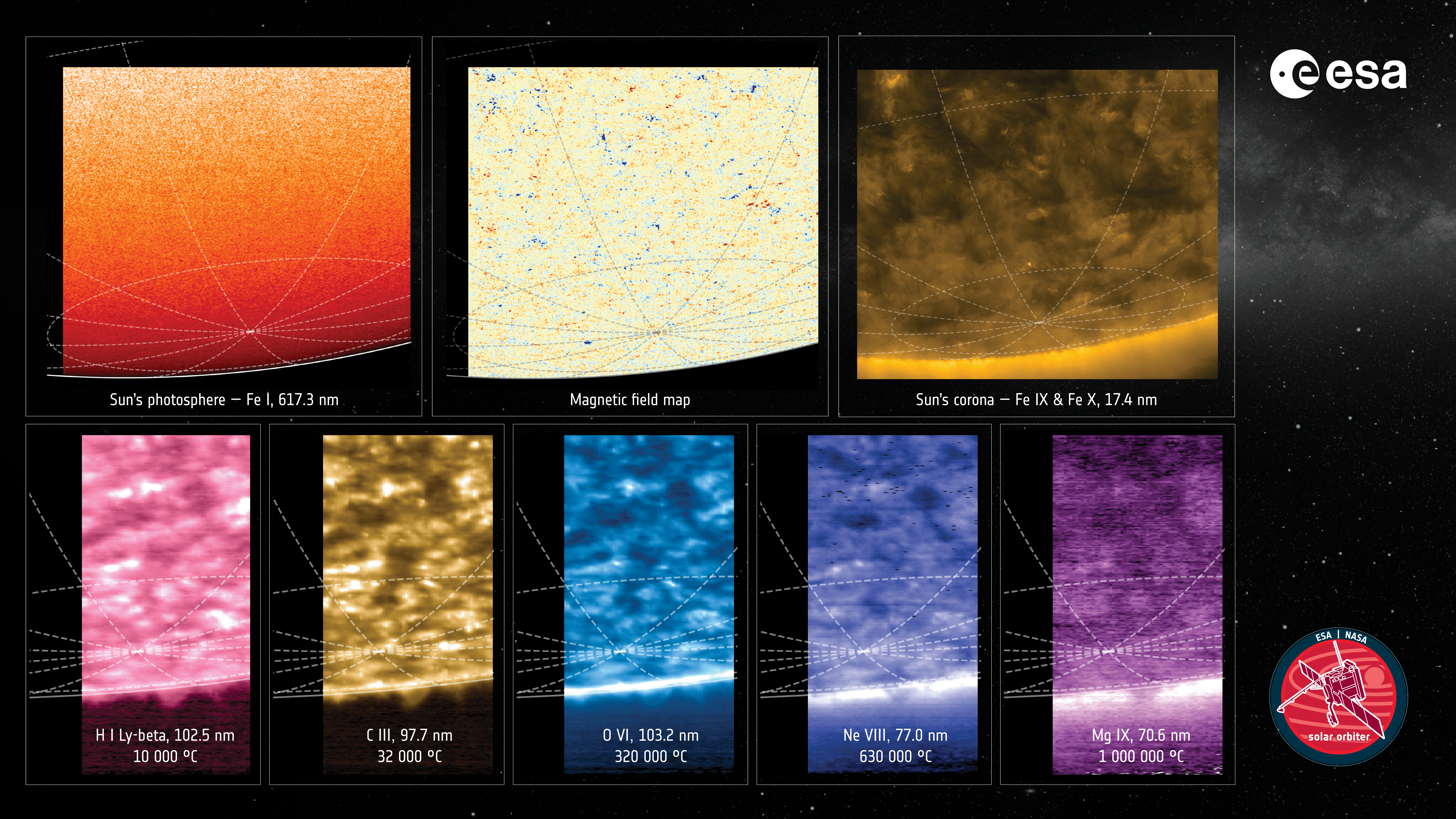
The collage of SoLO's view of the Sun's south pole on 16–17 March 2025, from a viewing angle of around 15° below the solar equator.

Solar Orbiter's image of the sun's corona, as it looks in ultraviolet light.

== See also ==
- List of heliophysics missions
- List of European Space Agency programmes and missions
