= Barbara J. Thompson =

American solar physicist

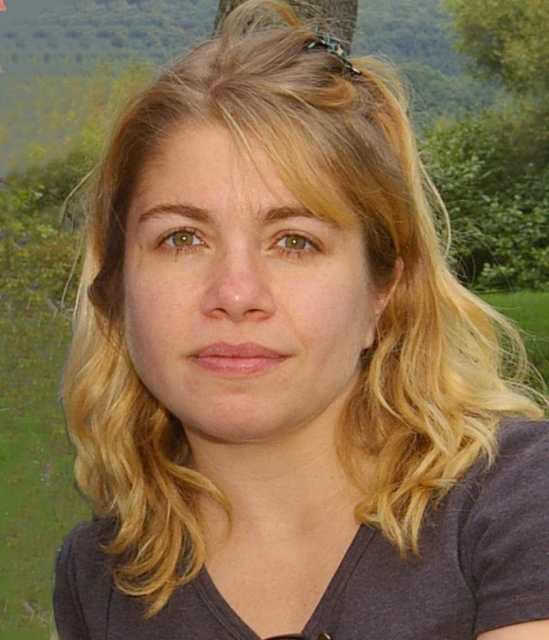
- Education: University of Pennsylvania (BA); University of Minnesota (PhD)
- Scientific career
- Fields: Astrophysics
- Workplaces: Goddard Space Flight Center
- Thesis: The role of inertial Alfvén waves in auroral particle acceleration (1997)

Barbara June Thompson is an American solar physicist. She is a scientist at Goddard Space Flight Center where she researches coronal mass ejections and the dynamics of coronal structures. Thompson was the project scientist for NASA's Solar Dynamics Observatory mission through development and early flight.

== Education ==
Thompson completed a B.A. in physics and mathematics with a minor in geology at the University of Pennsylvania in 1991. In 1996, she earned a Ph.D. in physics from the University of Minnesota. Her dissertation was titled The role of inertial Alfvén waves in auroral particle acceleration.

== Career ==
She is a scientist working as a civil servant at NASA's Goddard Space Flight Center. Thompson joined NASA's Goddard Space Flight Center in 1996 after completing her doctoral studies, initially working on the Solar and Heliospheric Observatory (SOHO) mission. She later joined the Solar Physics Branch in 1998 and has since participated in multiple solar satellite and instrument development programs. She was a major organizer of the global International Heliophysical Year effort to study external drivers of planetary environments (including Earth's). Thompson was the project scientist for NASA's Solar Dynamics Observatory mission through development and early flight, and continues to hold a major role in that mission, while conducting ongoing research into CME onset and propagation. She was a founder of the NASA Center for HelioAnalytics, focusing on data science, machine learning, and AI methods to advance scientific research.

=== Research ===
She is noted for wide-ranging contributions to the study of eruptive phenomena in the solar corona, beginning with the Solar and Heliospheric Observatory mission in the 1990s. Early work included EUV imaging studies of coronal mass ejections (CMEs) and their aftermath, including discovery of a global coronal wave response to the launch of CMEs ("EIT waves").

The majority of Thompson's solar research focuses on the study of coronal mass ejections and the dynamics of coronal structures. Her refereed publications often involve either CMEs or eruption-associated phenomena, such as dimmings and EUV waves. Her research efforts focus on understanding the dynamics of the solar corona and image processing/analysis efforts to examine eruptive structures, and the application of machine learning and advance mathematical methods to problem-solving.

Her current research efforts focus on using machine learning and data analytics to address NASA big data challenges. Her scientific leadership has emphasized cross-disciplinary development and innovation, including the establishment of the new Center for HelioAnalytics, a center for machine learning and neural net heliophysics at NASA Goddard.

Thompson has contributed to numerous highly cited studies in heliophysics and solar physics. Her work related to the Solar Dynamics Observatory mission has been widely influential; the overview paper describing the mission has been cited thousands of times in the scientific literature. She has also co-authored widely cited studies on the origins of geomagnetic storms and observations of coronal mass ejections using instruments aboard the Solar and Heliospheric Observatory (SOHO). These studies have helped improve scientific understanding of solar eruptions and their role in space weather affecting Earth.

The Solar Dynamics Observatory mission, launched in 2010 as part of NASA's Living With a Star program, continuously observes the Sun in multiple wavelengths to study solar variability and eruptive events such as solar flares and coronal mass ejections.

Understanding coronal mass ejections is important for predicting space weather events that can disrupt satellites, navigation systems, and electrical power infrastructure on Earth.

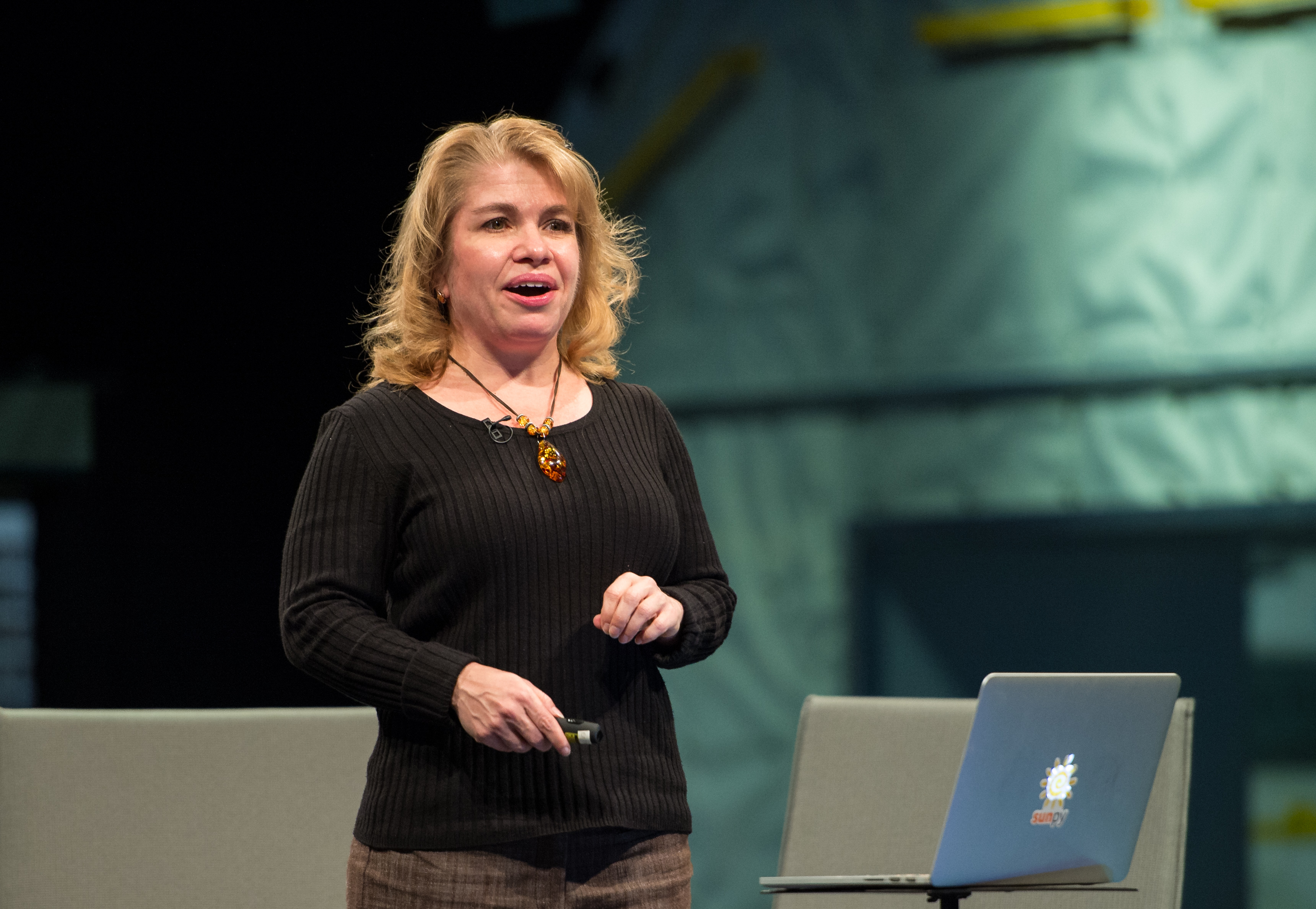
Barbara Thompson in 2016
