= Heliophysics =

Science of the heliosphere

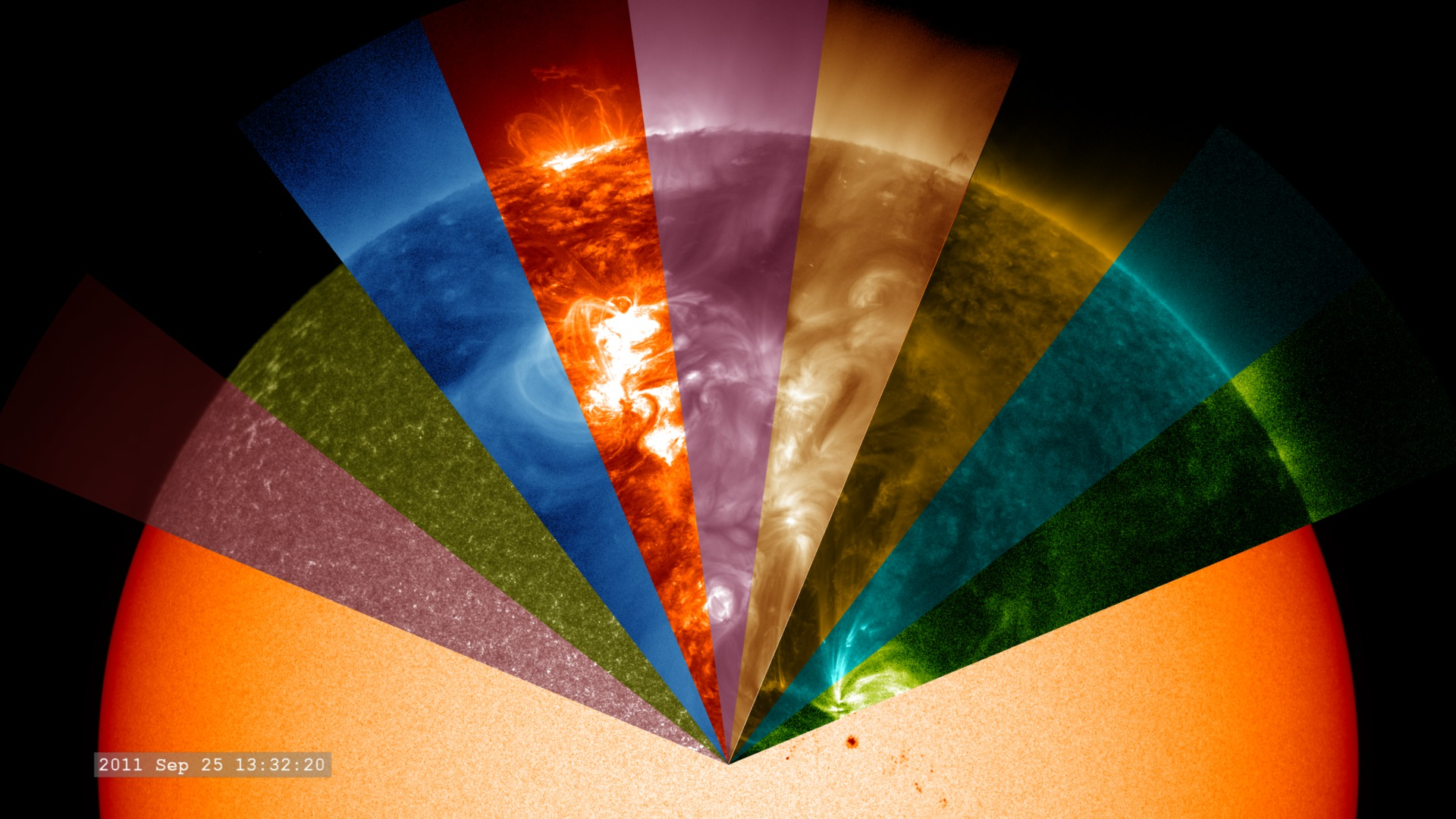
This image presents various wavelengths of light produced by the Sun.

Heliophysics (from the prefix "helio", from Attic Greek hḗlios, meaning Sun, and the noun "physics": the science of matter and energy and their interactions) is the physics of the Sun and its connection with the Solar System. NASA defines heliophysics as "(1) the comprehensive new term for the science of the Sun - Solar System Connection, (2) the exploration, discovery, and understanding of Earth's space environment, and (3) the system science that unites all of the linked phenomena in the region of the cosmos influenced by a star like our Sun."

Heliophysics is broader than Solar physics, that studies the Sun itself, including its interior, atmosphere, and magnetic fields. It concentrates on the Sun's effects on Earth and other bodies within the Solar System, as well as the changing conditions in space. It is primarily concerned with the magnetosphere, ionosphere, thermosphere, mesosphere, and upper atmosphere of the Earth and other planets. Heliophysics combines the science of the Sun, corona, heliosphere and geospace, and encompasses a wide variety of astronomical phenomena, including "cosmic rays and particle acceleration, space weather and radiation, dust and magnetic reconnection, nuclear energy generation and internal solar dynamics, solar activity and stellar magnetic fields, aeronomy and space plasmas, magnetic fields and global change", and the interactions of the Solar System with the Milky Way Galaxy.

== History and etymology ==
Term "heliophysics" (Russian: гелиофизика) was widely used in Russian-language scientific literature. The Great Soviet Encyclopedia third edition (1969–1978) defines "Heliophysics" as "[...] a division of astrophysics that studies physics of the Sun". In 1990, the Higher Attestation Commission, responsible for the advanced academic degrees in Soviet Union and later in Russia and the Former Soviet Union, established a new specialty "Heliophysics and physics of solar system". In English-language scientific literature prior to about 2001, the term heliophysics was sporadically used to describe the study of the "physics of the Sun". As such it was a direct translation from the French "héliophysique" and the Russian "гелиофизика". In 2001, Joseph M. Davila, Nat Gopalswamy and Barbara J. Thompson at NASA's Goddard Space Flight Center adopted the term in their preparations of what became known as the International Heliophysical Year (2007–2008), following 50 years after the International Geophysical Year; in adopting the term for this purpose, they expanded its meaning to encompass the entire domain of influence of the Sun (the heliosphere). As an early advocate of the newly expanded meaning, George Siscoe offered the following characterization:

"Heliophysics [encompasses] environmental science, a unique hybrid between meteorology and astrophysics, comprising a body of data and a set of paradigms (general laws—perhaps mostly still undiscovered) specific to magnetized plasmas and neutrals in the heliosphere interacting with themselves and with gravitating bodies and their atmospheres."

Around mid-2006, Richard R. Fisher, then Director of the Sun-Earth Connections Division of NASA's Science Mission Directorate, was challenged by the NASA administrator to come up with a concise new name for his division that "had better end on 'physics'". He proposed "Heliophysics Science Division", which has been in use since then. The Heliophysics Science Division uses the term "heliophysics" to denote the study of the heliosphere and the objects that interact with it – most notably planetary atmospheres and magnetospheres, the solar corona, and the interstellar medium.

Heliophysical research connects directly to a broader web of physical processes that naturally expand its reach beyond NASA's narrower view that limits it to the Solar System: heliophysics reaches from solar physics out to stellar physics in general, and involves several branches of nuclear physics, plasma physics, space physics and magnetospheric physics. The science of heliophysics lies at the foundation of the study of space weather, and is also directly involved in understanding planetary habitability.

== Background ==
The Sun is an active star, and Earth is located within its atmosphere, so there is a dynamic interaction. The Sun' light influences all life and processes on Earth; it is an energy provider that allows and sustains life on Earth. However, the Sun also produces streams of high energy particles known as the solar wind, and radiation that can harm life or alter its evolution. Under the protective shield of Earth's magnetic field and its atmosphere, Earth can be seen as an island in the universe where life has developed and flourished.

The intertwined response of the Earth and heliosphere are studied because the planet is immersed in this unseen environment. Above the protective cocoon of Earth's lower atmosphere is a plasma soup composed of electrified and magnetized matter entwined with penetrating radiation and energetic particles. Modern technologies are susceptible to the extremes of space weather — severe disturbances of the upper atmosphere and of the near-Earth space environment that are driven by the magnetic activity of the Sun. Strong electrical currents driven in the Earth's surface during auroral events can disrupt and damage modern electric power grids and may contribute to the corrosion of oil and gas pipelines.

== Heliophysics research program ==
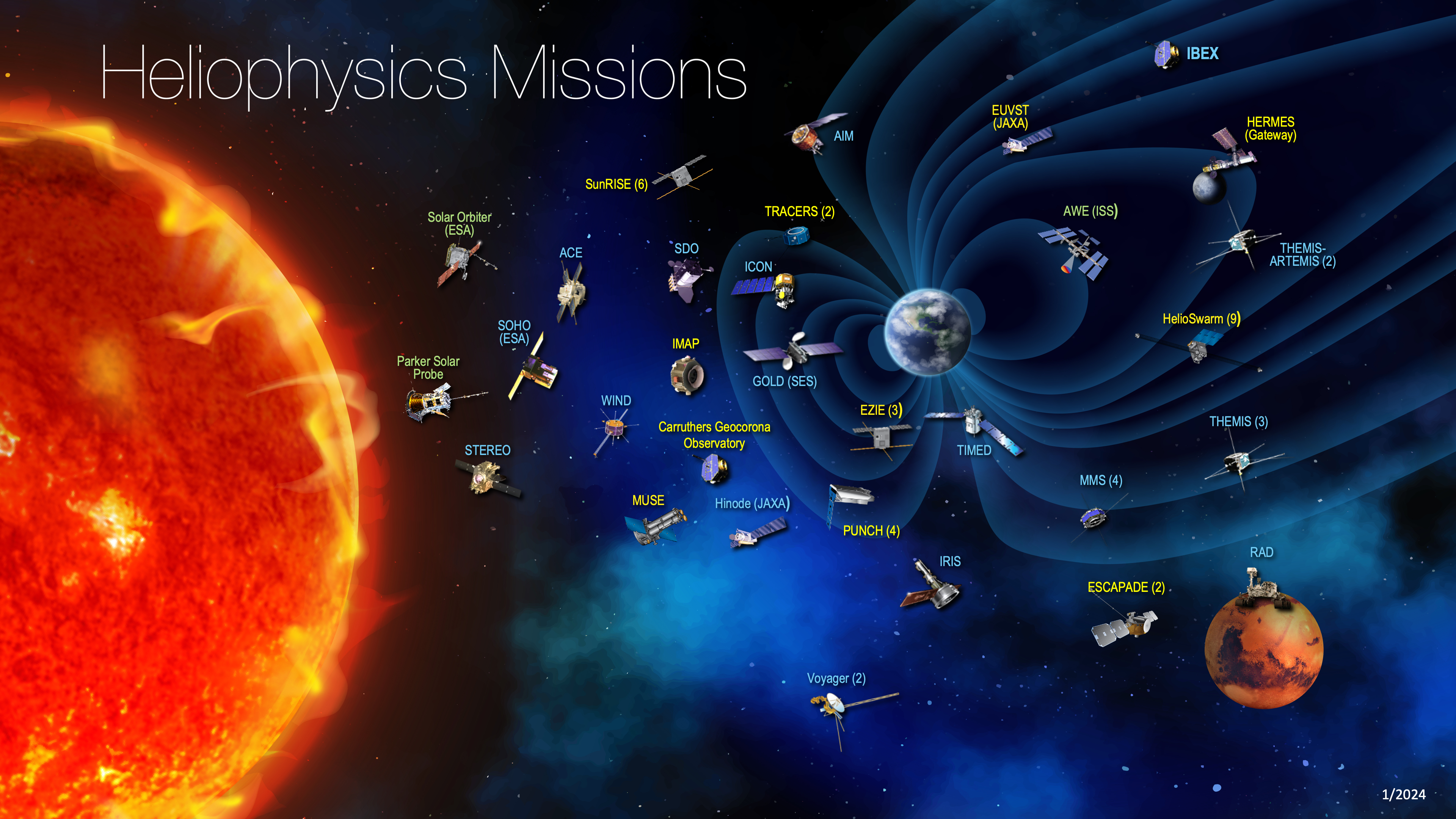
Current and future heliophysics missions, 2024

Methods have been developed to see into the internal workings of the Sun and understand how the Earth's magnetosphere responds to solar activity. Further studies are concerned with exploring the full system of complex interactions that characterize the relationship of the Sun with the Solar System.

There are three primary objectives that define the multi-decadal studies:

- To understand the changing flow of energy and matter throughout the Sun, heliosphere, and planetary environments.
- To explore the fundamental physical processes of space plasma systems.
- To define the origins and societal impacts of variability in the Earth-Sun system.

=== Heliosphere ===
Plasmas and their embedded magnetic fields affect the formation and evolution of planets and planetary systems. The heliosphere shields the Solar System from galactic cosmic radiation. Earth is shielded by its magnetic field, protecting it from solar and cosmic particle radiation and from erosion of the atmosphere by the solar wind. Planets without a shielding magnetic field, such as Mars and Venus, are exposed to those processes and evolve differently. On Earth, the magnetic field changes strength and configuration during its occasional polarity reversals, altering the shielding of the planet from external radiation sources.

=== Magnetospheres ===
Determine changes in the Earth's magnetosphere, ionosphere, and upper atmosphere in order to enable specification, prediction, and mitigation of their effects. Heliophysics seeks to develop an understanding of the response of the near-Earth plasma regions to space weather. This complex, highly coupled system protects Earth from the worst solar disturbances while redistributing energy and mass throughout.

== See also ==
- NASA's Heliophysics Science Division
- List of heliophysics missions
  - Parker Solar Probe
  - Solar Orbiter
  - Solar and Heliospheric Observatory (SOHO)
  - Solar Dynamics Observatory (SDO)
  - STEREO
  - Ulysses
- Aeronomy
- Advanced Composition Explorer (ACE)
- WIND
- Magnetospheric Multiscale Mission (MMS)
- Cluster II
- Solar and Space Physics Decadal Survey
