= Magnetic Data Acquisition System =

Magnetic Data Acquisition System (abbr. MAGDAS) is a system of 50 realtime magnetometers that are being deployed by Kyushu Sangyo University of Fukuoka, Japan, as part of Japan's leading contribution to International Heliophysical Year of the United Nations.

In April 2007 the deployment was concentrated along the 210 magnetic meridian, which means north and south of Japan. However, during the current stage of expansion, units are also being deployed along the geomagnetic equator, in places such as Malaysia, Ethiopia, Nigeria, Ivory Coast, Brazil, Antarctica, and from October 2012 Ecuador. Data from each unit is sent in real time to a data center located at SERC (Space Environment Research Center of Kyushu University).

Arguably the most exotic place where a MAGDAS unit is operating is at Davis (Antarctica) of the Australian Antarctic Division.
