= George Siscoe =

American physicist

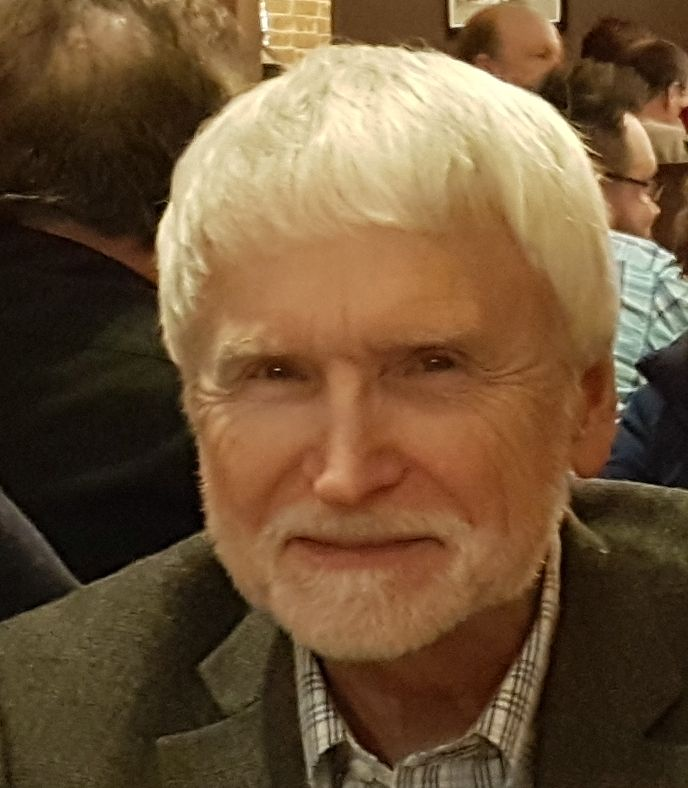
- Born: Lansing, Michigan, United States
- Citizenship: United States
- Education: Massachusetts Institute of Technology
- Occupation: Physicist
- Employer: Boston University

George L. Siscoe (June 13, 1937 – April 9, 2022) was an American physicist and professor emeritus of space physics at Boston University. He made major contributions to the understanding of the Earth's magnetosphere and the heliosphere, particularly in helping to establishing the field of space weather and the term heliophysics - a term which is now standard use.

== Early life and education ==
Siscoe was born in Lansing, Michigan, in 1937 and studied at the Massachusetts Institute of Technology (MIT), receiving his bachelor's degree in 1960 and his doctorate in 1964, both in physics.

== Research career ==
Siscoe published over 300 peer-reviewed articles (as of 10 October 2019) across a range of topics within space physics. His early career was as a postdoctoral fellow at the California Institute of Technology, becoming an assistant professor of physics at MIT in 1966 before moving to the University of California, Los Angeles (UCLA) as a tenured professor. While at UCLA, he was chair of the Department of Atmospheric Science from 1983 to 1988 and again from 1991 to 1993.

In 1993, he made his final move to Boston University as a research professor. Alongside academic papers, Siscoe co-edited a monograph on space weather and several textbooks on heliophysics.

He was a fellow of the American Geophysical Union (AGU), where the fellowship program recognizes AGU members who have made exceptional contributions to Earth and space science through a breakthrough, discovery, or innovation in their field.

In his retirement he owned and ran the Old Professor's Bookshop in Belfast, Maine.

== Awards, honors, and scientific citizenship ==
- Chair, Committee on Space and Solar Physics (CSSP), National Research Council (NRC), 1997–2000
- Chair, Geospace General Circulation Model (GGCM) Steering Committee, National Science Foundation / Geospace Environment Modeling (NSF/GEM), 1997–2000
- The James Van Allen Lecture is presented two out of every three years to a space scientist who has made significant contributions to the field of magnetospheric science by the American Geophysical Union. Siscoe received this honor in 1991, only the second time it had been awarded
- Fellow of the American Geophysical Union (1987)
- Chair, Panel on Long-Term Solar-Terrestrial Observations, NRC, 1985–1987
- Chair, Scientific Programs Evaluation Committee, National Center for Atmospheric Research (NCAR), 1986–1987
- Chair of NASA's Space Physics Advisory Committee (1985–1991)
- Editor of the Journal of Geophysical Research (JGR) and associate editor of Reviews of Geophysics and Space Physics
