= Magnetic switchback =

Magnetic field reversals in the solar wind

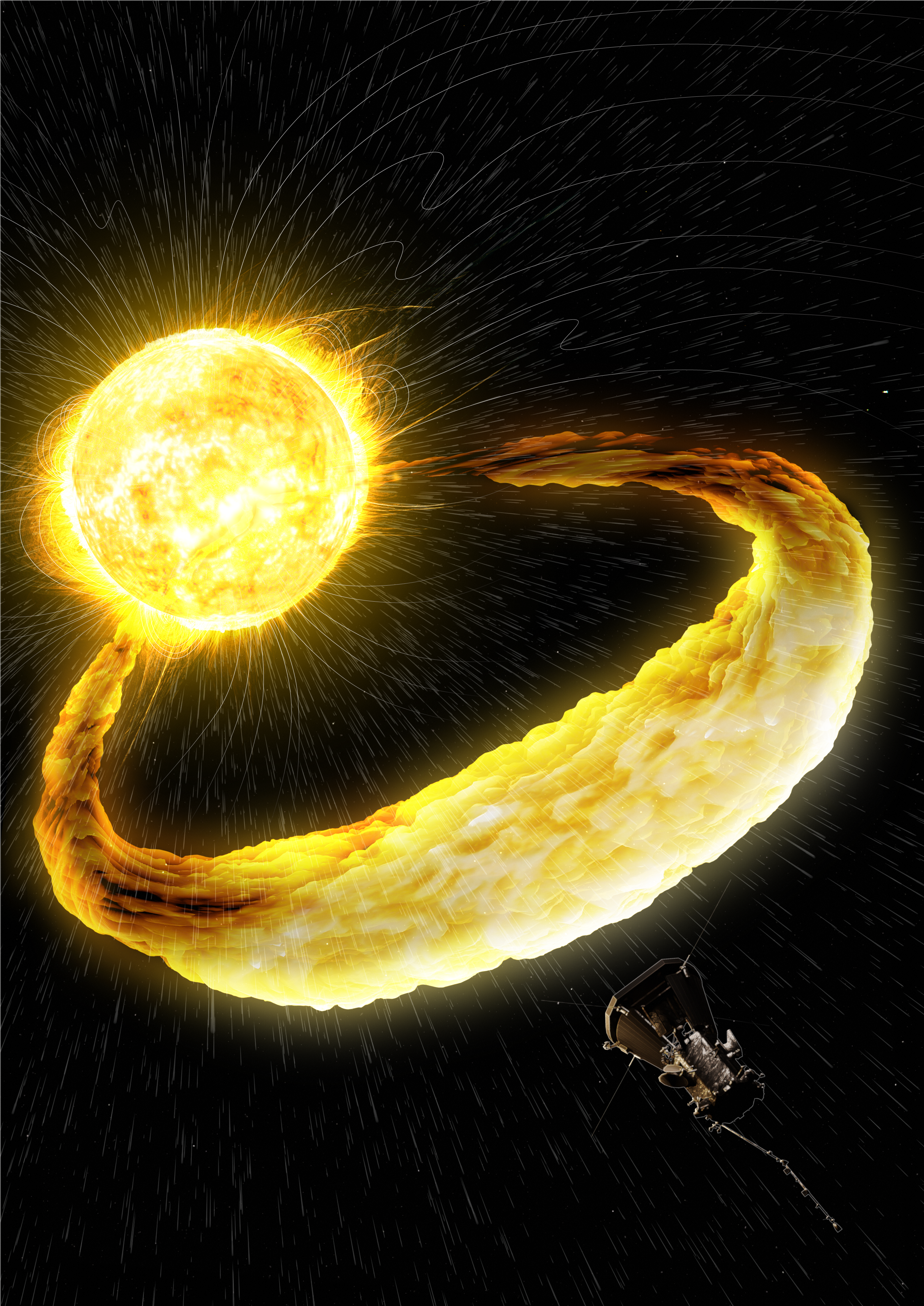
Artist's impression of PSP and magnetic switchback

Magnetic switchbacks are sudden reversals in the magnetic field of the solar wind. They can also be described as traveling disturbances in the solar wind that caused the magnetic field to bend back on itself. They were first observed by the NASA-ESA mission Ulysses, the first spacecraft to fly over the Sun's poles. NASA's Parker Solar Probe and NASA/ESA Solar Orbiter both observed switchbacks.

== Definition ==
Parker Solar Probe observed switchbacks — traveling disturbances in the solar wind that caused the magnetic field to bend back on itself.

Magnetic (or solar) switchback is a rapid polarity reversals of the radial heliospheric magnetic field. These events have been termed "switchbacks", when referring to the change in magnetic field direction, or "velocity spikes", when referring to the sharp increase in solar wind speed.

The switchbacks generate heat that warms solar corona.

== Observations ==
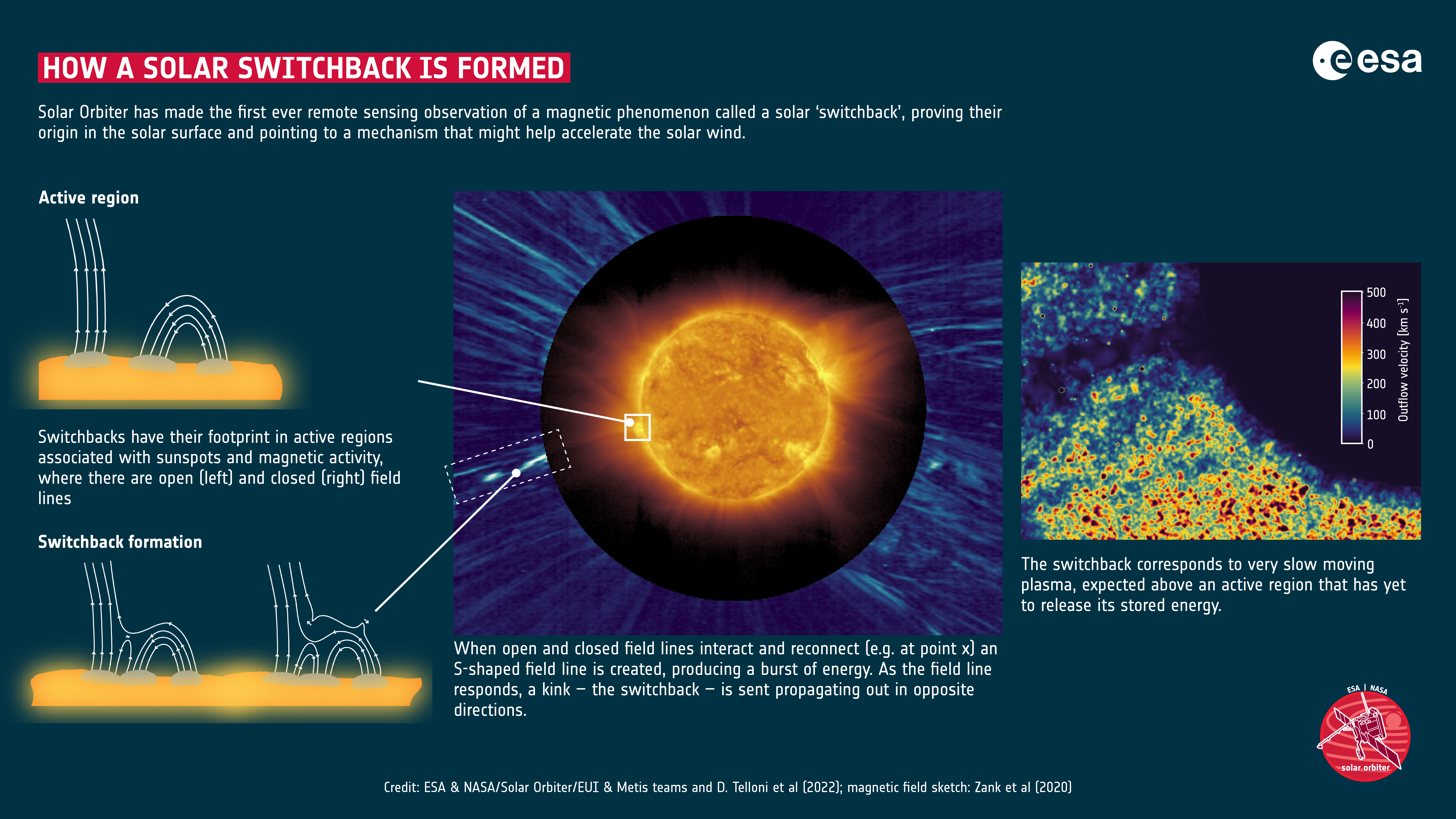
ESA infographic on solar switchback formation

Helios 1 and 2 spacecraft observed sudden reversals of the Sun's magnetic field in 1970s. Magnetic switchbacks were then observed by the Ulysses in 1995-1996, during the solar minimum, when the spacecraft detected numerous radial magnetic field polarity inversions. Similar structures were then observed by near-Earth heliospheric spacecraft such as Advanced Composition Explorer. Parker Solar Probe (PSP) observed first switchback on November 6, 2018. Similar effects were observed at distances around and below 0.3 AU, 1 AU, and up to 2.9 AU, and, as noted by Fedorov et al, "the question of whether all such observations relate to the same phenomenon is still open."

On 27 September 2020, ESA/NASA Solar Orbiter (SolO) sampled a solar wind stream magnetically connected to a southern hemisphere coronal hole, while it was at 0.98 AU from Sun, and observed a fast solar wind with strong fluctuations of the magnetic field. The structures observed by SolO may effectively stand as the surviving remains of the switchbacks created near Sun and also observed by PSP.

Given the phase of the solar cycle, if PSP was in the southern magnetic hemisphere, the solar wind magnetic field should always have had a magnetic polarity oriented inward toward the Sun. Instead, PSP observed thousands of intervals, ranging in duration from seconds to tens of minutes where the speed of the solar wind flow suddenly jumps and the magnetic field orientation rotates by nearly 180° in the most extreme cases, before returning just as quickly to the original solar wind conditions.

SolO has found compelling clues as to the origin of magnetic switchbacks during its closest pass by the sun on 25 March 2022. Using the data of the Solar Orbiter Daniele Telloni and Gary Zank and their team came to the conclusion that the theory based on Ulysses data is correct, they "proved that switchbacks occur when there is an interaction between a region of open field lines and a region of closed field lines".

A 2025 paper reported detection of a magnetic switchback in Earth's magnetic field with data from the Magnetospheric Multiscale Mission.

== Theories ==
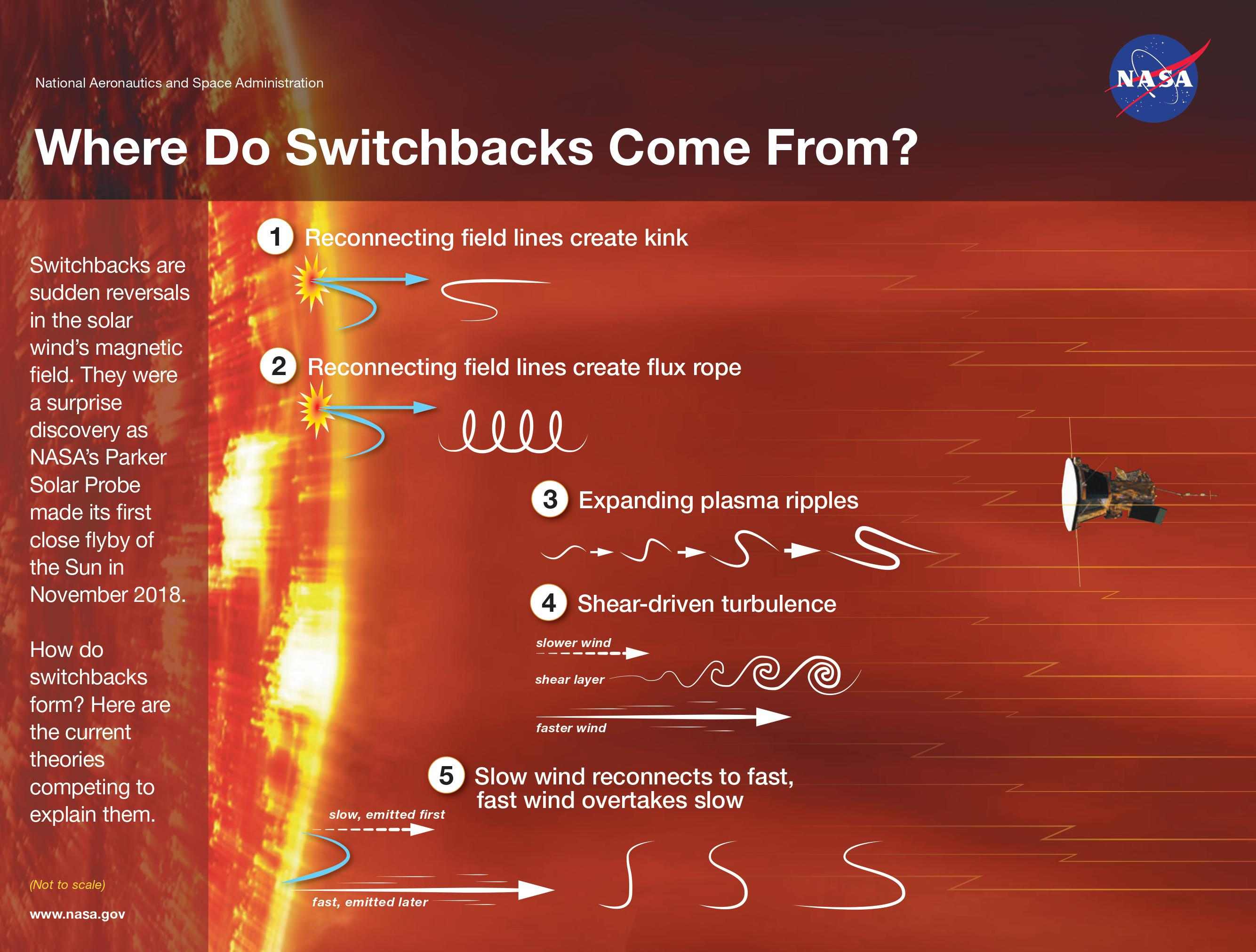
Switchback theories infographic from NASA

One theory, based on the Ulysses data, suggests that switchbacks are the result of a clash between open and closed magnetic fields. When an open magnetic field line brushes against a closed magnetic loop, they can reconfigure in a process called interchange reconnection – an explosive rearrangement of the magnetic fields that leads to a switchback shape. The open line snaps onto the closed loop, cutting free a hot burst of plasma from the loop, while "gluing" the two fields into a new configuration. That sudden snap throws an S-shaped kink into the open magnetic field line before the loop reseals. The Parker Solar Probe observed its first switchback on November 6, 2018. The observed switchback was close to the developed model.

A second theory agrees on the import of interchange reconnection, but differs on the nature of switchbacks themselves. Instead of viewing switchbacks as a kink in a magnetic field line, the second theory suggests it is the signature of a kind of magnetic structure, called a flux rope.

Another theory suggests that switchbacks form naturally as the solar wind expands into space.

== Gallery ==
Illustration of Parker Solar Probe flying through a switchback in the solar wind.

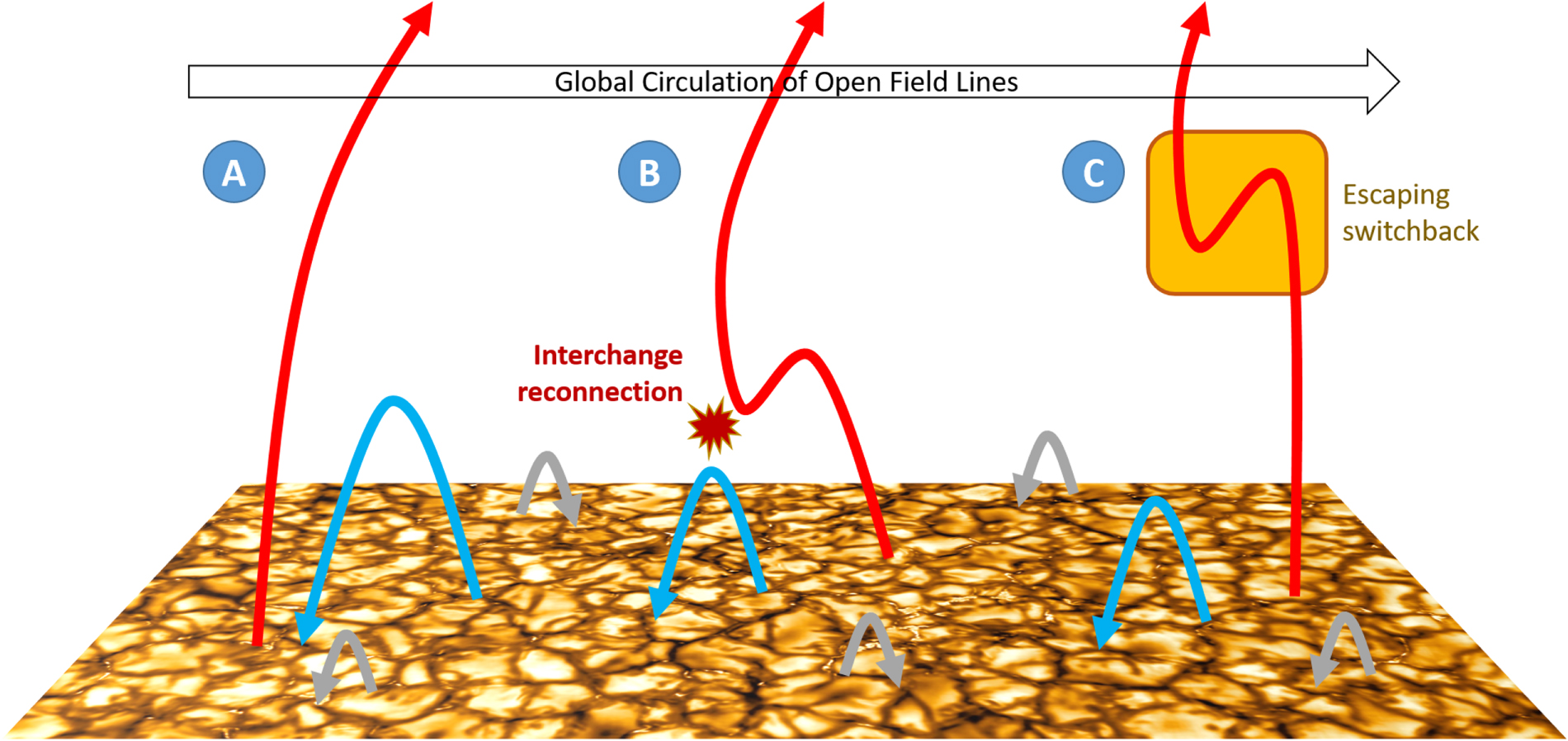
Illustration of global magnetic field circulation enabled by interchange reconnection. In this scenario an open magnetic field line is (A) dragged against a large coronal loop, by global circulation in the corona, (B) undergoes interchange reconnection, and (C) effectively jumps the approximate width of the originally closed loop, launching an S-shaped switchback in the magnetic field into the corona.

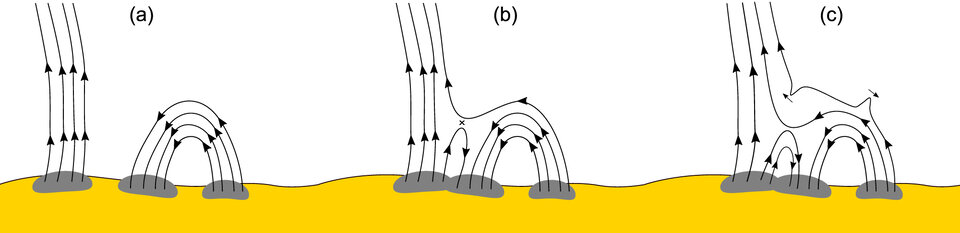
Close to the Sun, and especially above active regions, there are open and closed magnetic field lines. The closed lines are loops of magnetism that arch up into the solar atmosphere before curving round and disappearing back into the Sun.

== See also ==
- Magnetic reconnection
