= Sun-Earth Day =

NASA and ESA joint educational program

Sun-Earth Day is a joint educational program established in 2000 by NASA and ESA. The goal of the program is to popularize the knowledge about the Sun, and the way it influences life on Earth, among students and the public. The day itself is mainly celebrated in the United States near the time of the spring equinox. However, the Sun-Earth Day event actually runs throughout the year, with a different theme being chosen each year.

== Themes ==
The selection of each year's theme often corresponds to events for that year. Every theme is supported by free educational plans for both informal and formal educators. Here is a list of themes by year:

Sun-Earth Day (Themes)
Year	Date	Theme
2001		Having a Solar Blast
2002		Celebrate the Equinox
2003		Live from the Aurora
2004		Venus Transit
2005		Ancient Observatories Timeless Knowledge
2006		Eclipse: In a Different Light
2007		Living in the Atmosphere of the Sun
2008		Space Weather Around the World
2009		Our Sun, Yours to Discover
2010		Magnetic Storms
2011	March 19, 2011	Ancient Mysteries; Future Discoveries.
2012	June 5, 2012	Transit of Venus
2013		Solar Max – Storm Warning!
2014		[data missing]
2015		[data missing]
2016		[data missing]
2017		[data missing]
