= International Heliophysical Year =

United Nations observance for 2007–2008

The International Heliophysical Year is a UN-sponsored scientifically driven international program of scientific collaboration to understand external drivers of planetary environments and universal processes in solar-terrestrial-planetary-heliospheric physics. The IHY will focus on advancements in all aspects of the heliosphere and its interaction with the interstellar medium. This effort culminated in the "International Heliophysical Year" (IHY) in 2007–2008. The IHY concluded in February 2009, but was largely continued via the International Space Weather Initiative (ISWI)

The term "Heliophysical" was coined to refer specifically to this activity of studying the interconnectedness of the entire solar-heliospheric-planetary system. It is a broadening of the concept of "geophysical," extending the connections from the Earth to the Sun and interplanetary space. On the 50th anniversary of the International Geophysical Year, the 2007 IHY activities will build on the success of IGY 1957 by continuing its legacy of system-sides studies of the extended heliophysical domain.

== History ==
The IHY 2007 has been planned to coincide with the fiftieth anniversary of the International Geophysical Year (IGY) in 1957–1958, one of the most successful international science programs of all time. The IGY was a broad-based and all-encompassing effort to push the frontiers of geophysics, which resulted in tremendous progress in space physics, Sun-Earth connections, planetary science and the heliosphere in general. The tradition of international science years began almost 125 years ago with the first International Polar Year and international scientific studies of global processes at the North Pole in 1882–1883. The IHY has received substantial support from the United Nations, and various space agencies around the world.

== Objectives ==
The IHY has three primary objectives:

- Advancing our Understanding of the Heliophysical Processes that Govern the Sun, Earth and Heliosphere
- Continuing the tradition of international research and advancing the legacy on the 50th anniversary of the International Geophysical Year
- Demonstrating the Beauty, Relevance and Significance of Space and Earth Science to the World

== Science goals ==
The IHY team has also identified the following science goals for 2007-2008:

1. Develop the basic science of heliophysics through cross-disciplinary studies of universal processes.
2. Determine the response of terrestrial and planetary magnetospheres and atmospheres to external drivers.
3. Promote research on the Sun-heliosphere system outward to the local interstellar medium – the new frontier.
4. Foster international scientific cooperation in the study of heliophysical phenomena now and in the future
5. Communicate unique IHY results to the scientific community and the general public

== See also ==
- Magnetic Data Acquisition System (MAGDAS)
- Sun-Earth Day
