= Solar moss =

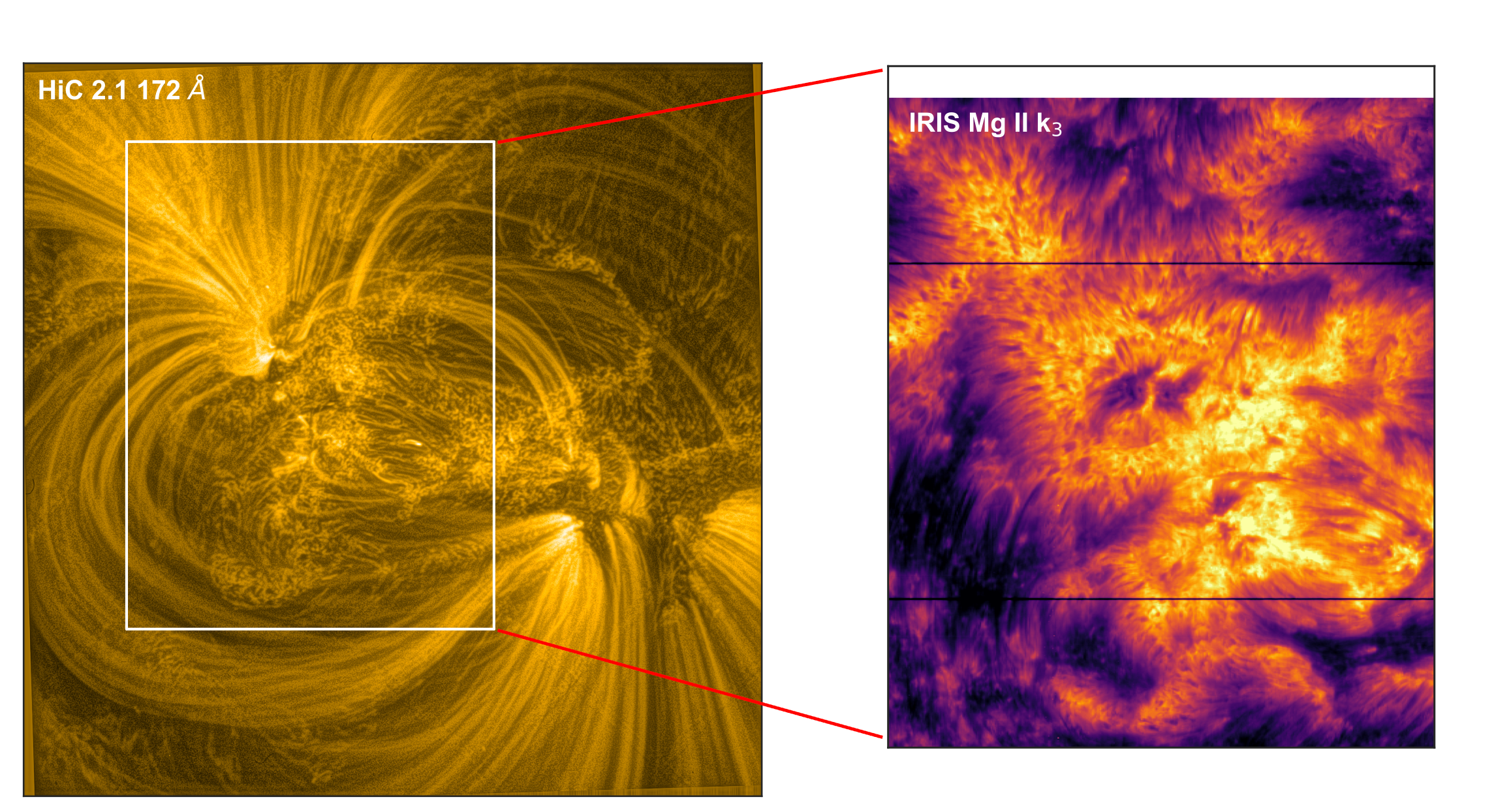
Solar moss by High Resolution Coronal Imager

Sun's corona by Solar Orbiter. Solar moss, spicules, eruption and rain and highlighted.

Solar moss is a distinctive feature in the Sun's atmosphere discovered by NASA's Transition Region and Coronal Explorer (TRACE) spacecraft in 1999. It appears as bright, "sponge-like" patches in extreme ultraviolet light, occurring 1,000-3,000 miles above the Sun's visible surface at the base of hot coronal loops in active regions.

The moss consists of hot plasma that emits extreme ultraviolet radiation. Its characteristic spongy texture comes from the interaction between this hot plasma and cooler jets rising from the Sun's lower atmosphere (chromosphere). Moss appears in patches spanning 6,000-12,000 miles, typically found at the footpoints of high-pressure coronal loops in active regions. While moss formations usually persist for tens of hours, they can form and spread rapidly following solar flares.

Recent research using coordinated observations from NASA's Interface Region Imaging Spectrograph (IRIS) and the High Resolution Coronal Imager (Hi-C) sounding rocket has revealed that moss heating likely results from the dissipation of current sheets caused by magnetic field braiding. This process heats plasma simultaneously to chromospheric and coronal temperatures, creating a strong correlation between heating patterns at different atmospheric heights.
