= Catherine Walker (US scientist) =

American Earth and planetary scientist

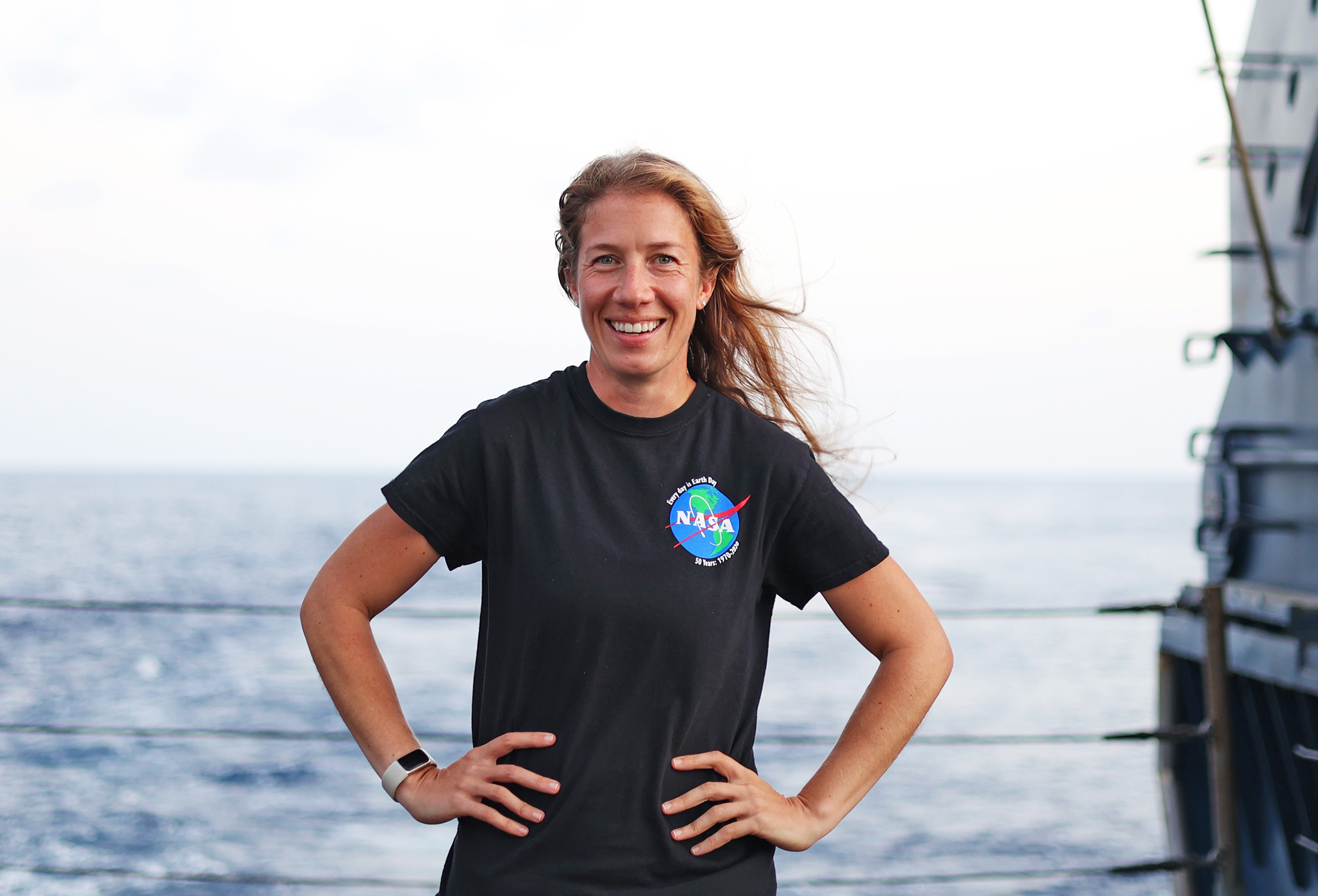
- Walker on R/V Atlantis in 2022
- Born: High Point, NC
- Scientific career
- Fields: Planetary Science; Earth Science; Glaciology
- Institutions: Georgia Institute of Technology (2013-2015); Jet Propulsion Lab (2015-2018); University of Maryland College Park (2018-present); Woods Hole Oceanographic Institution (2019-present)
- Thesis: Fracture of Antarctic Ice Shelves and Implications for the Icy Satellites of the Outer Solar System
- Doctoral advisor: Jeremy N. Bassis
- Other academic advisors: Helen Fricker; Britney Schmidt; Tom Neumann (NASA)

Catherine Walker (Catherine Colello Walker) is an American Earth and planetary scientist at the Woods Hole Oceanographic Institution, where she is on the scientific staff in the Department of Applied Ocean Physics and Engineering. Her research spans fracture mechanics and dynamics in ice, cryosphere change, physical oceanography, and geomorphology on Earth and other planets and moons using a variety of methodologies including remote sensing.

Her scientific contributions include studies of ice shelf rifting and iceberg calving, oceanic drivers of Antarctic ice loss, and the formation of ice fracture and collapse features on Europa and Enceladus. In 2022, she was part of the team that observed the collapse of the Conger-Glenzer Ice Shelf, a first in East Antarctica. She was educated at Mount Holyoke College and the University of Michigan, followed by postdoctoral positions at Georgia Institute of Technology and Caltech/NASA Jet Propulsion Laboratory and a senior fellowship at NASA Headquarters.

== Biography ==
Catherine Walker was born in High Point, North Carolina with her twin sister, Cynthia, to parents Cheryl (née Colello), an early childhood educator, and George Walker II, a surgeon. The family moved to North Andover, Massachusetts in the late 1980s. Walker attended North Andover Public Schools, where she developed an interest in science and becoming an astronaut at an early age.

Walker attended Mount Holyoke College, one of the Seven Sisters, and was advised by planetary geologist Darby Dyar. Walker graduated with her B. A. in Astronomy and a minor in Geology magna cum laude. During her undergraduate years, she conducted research at University of New Hampshire, working with space physicist Vania Jordanova analyzing magnetospheric substorms using the NASA/ESA Cluster spacecraft, and space physicist Antoinette Galvin on the pre- and post-launch analyses for the Plasma and SupraThremal Ion Composition (PLASTIC) instrument on NASA's Solar TErrestrial RElations Observatory (STEREO) mission that launched in 2006. In 2007, Walker joined the NASA Academy at Goddard Space Flight Center (GSFC), working on optical instrumentation to observe dust cyclones on Mars with optical physicist Brent Bos. She later joined the GSFC Planetary Magnetospheres Lab, conducting observing campaigns at Kitt Peak National Observatory on Jupiter's moon Io. Walker began the Ph.D. program in Space Physics at Florida Institute of Technology before transferring to the Ph.D. program in Atmospheric, Oceanic and Space Sciences at the University of Michigan.

Walker was advised by glaciologist Jeremy Bassis and her Ph.D. research focused on the geophysics of floating ice, including Ocean World ice shells and terrestrial ice shelves, in particular on the remote sensing of fracture mechanics. Significant contributions from her Ph.D. work included the first circum-Antarctic catalog of ice shelf rifts, ice shell thickness estimates for the South Polar region of Enceladus, and theoretical work spearheaded by Bassis now referred to as the Marine Ice Cliff Instability (MICI). While at Michigan, she also completed coursework towards a Masters' of Engineering in Space Systems Engineering with former NASA Administrator Thomas Zurbuchen.

Walker was a postdoc at Georgia Tech working with planetary scientist Britney Schmidt on terrestrial analogs for Ocean Worlds ice-ocean interactions, and deployed with Schmidt's team to Antarctica to test the Icefin underwater vehicle. Next she was NASA Postdoc Program Fellow at the Jet Propulsion Laboratory working in the Sea Level and Ice Group on marine-terminating glacier change in Antarctica. She moved to NASA Goddard Space Flight Center as a visiting assistant scientist in the Cryospheric Sciences Lab, working with Project Scientist Tom Neumann in the Project Science Office for NASA's ICESat-2 mission. She was awarded a NASA Senior Management Fellowship at NASA Headquarters, working in the Office of the Chief Scientist with James L. Green. Contemporaneously, she served as the Program Officer for the Planetary Instrument Concepts for the Advancement of Solar System Observations (PICASSO) technology development program for in the Planetary Science Division. She is now on the scientific staff at Woods Hole Oceanographic Institution led by Peter DeMenocal, where she works on ice-ocean interactions on Earth and in space. She uses remote sensing (including as part of the ICESat-2 Science Team) and field work, and works on developing technology to explore extreme environments, including diving in HOV Alvin. Most of her work is supported by NASA, in addition to the National Science Foundation (NSF).

== Select publications ==
- Bassis, Jeremy N.; Walker, Catherine C. (2011-11-23). "Upper and lower limits on the stability of calving glaciers from the yield strength envelope of ice". Proceedings of the Royal Society A. 468 (2140): 913–931. doi:10.1098/rspa.2011.0422. eISSN 1471-2946. S2CID 756727.
- Walker, C.C.; Bassis, J.N.; Fricker, H.A.; Czerwinski, R.J. (2013-10-16). "Structural and environmental controls on Antarctic ice shelf rift propagation inferred from satellite monitoring". Journal of Geophysical Research: Planets. 118 (4): 2354–2364. Bibcode:2013JGRF..118.2354W. doi:10.1002/2013JF002742. hdl:2027.42/102662. S2CID 129004220.
- Spears, Anthony; West, Michael; Mesiter, Matthew; Buffo, Jacob; Walkter, Catherine; Collins, Thomas Riley; Howard, Ayanna; Schmidt, Britney (2016-11-07). "Under ice in antarctica: The icefin unmanned underwater vehicle development and deployment". IEEE Robotics & Automation Magazine. 23 (4): 30–41. Bibcode:2016IRAM...23d..30S. doi:10.1109/MRA.2016.2578858. S2CID 206482459.
- Walker, Catherine C.; Gardner, Alex S. (2017-10-15). "Rapid drawdown of Antarctica's Wordie Ice Shelf glaciers in response to ENSO/Southern Annular Mode-driven warming in the Southern Ocean". Earth and Planetary Science Letters. 476: 00–110. Bibcode:2017E&PSL.476..100W. doi:10.1016/j.epsl.2017.08.005. S2CID 134253708.
- Buffo, JJ; Schmidt, Britney Elyce; Huber, Christian; Walker, Catherine Colello (2020-09-20). "Entrainment and dynamics of ocean-derived impurities within Europa's ice shell". Journal of Geophysical Research: Planets. 125 (10) e2020JE006394. Bibcode:2020JGRE..12506394B. doi:10.1029/2020JE006394. hdl:1912/26493. S2CID 148564271.
