= Christopher Scott =

Christopher or Chris Scott may refer to:

== Sports ==
- Chris Scott (Australian footballer) (born 1976), Australian rules footballer and coach
- Chris Scott (cricketer, born 1964), English cricketer for Nottinghamshire and Durham
- Chris Scott (cricketer, born 1959), English cricketer for Lancashire
- Chris Scott (defensive end) (born 1961), American football defensive end
- Chris Scott (English footballer) (born 1980), football player for Burnley and Leigh RMI
- Chris Scott (offensive lineman) (born 1987), American football offensive tackle
- Christopher Scott (cyclist) (born 1968), Australian Paralympian cyclist
- Chris Scott (discus thrower) (born 1988), British discus thrower who competed at the 2010 Commonwealth Games
- Christopher Scott (footballer, born 2002), German footballer

== Others ==
- Chris Scott (musician), British bass player for 1980s pop groups Talulah Gosh and Saturn 5
- Chris Scott (chef), American chef and restaurateur
- Chris Scott (writer) (born 1945), English-Canadian writer
- Christopher C. Scott (1807–1859), justice of the Arkansas Supreme Court
- Christopher J. Scott, television, film and theater producer in New York City
- Christopher Scott (painter), partner of Henry Geldzahler
- Chris Scott (politician), Canadian politician from Ontario
- Christopher Scott (scientist), British space physicist
