= Christopher Scott (scientist) =

British scientist

Christopher John Scott (né Davis) is a British scientist and professor of space and atmospheric physics at the University of Reading. His research focuses on the boundary and links between the atmosphere and space. He is the former project scientist for the Heliospheric Imager instruments on NASA's twin STEREO spacecraft.

== Education and research career ==
Scott attended Brockenhust College, before completing a BSc in Physics with Planetary & Space Physics at Aberystwyth University in 1989. He was awarded a PhD in upper atmosphere and auroral physics at the University of Southampton in 1993. After his PhD, he moved to the Rutherford Appleton Laboratory, initially to support the EISCAT ionospheric radar, before taking up a number of research posts, including project scientist for the Heliospheric Imagers on the twin STEREO spacecraft. At the Rutherford Appleton Laboratory, Scott worked closely with Richard Harrison and Mike Lockwood. In 2010, Scott moved to the University of Reading.

== Research highlights ==
Scott's primary research focus is on the ionosphere, particularly perturbations from below by atmospheric phenomenon. Scott was the first scientist to demonstrate lightning effects on the 'sporadic E' layer; transient, localized patches of relatively high electron density in the mid-ionosphere, which significantly affect radio-wave propagation. He subsequently investigated the relation between lightning occurrence and magnetic structures in the solar wind. Scott has also used novel datasets to study how pressure waves from the lower atmosphere can lead to disturbances in the ionosphere, most notably using records of the London Blitz World War II bombing raids and ionospheric measurements from Slough.

Using the Heliospheric Imager instruments on the STEREO spacecraft, Scott made the first observations of a solar eruption tracked continuously from the Sun to the Earth.

== Public outreach and citizen science ==
Scott is actively involved in the public communication and promotion of science. He has made numerous appearances on TV and radio, most notably the BBC's Sky at Night, Newsnight, BBC Radio 4's Today programme, BBC2's James May's Man Lab, ITN news, and the Discovery Channel. He was science adviser for episode 1 of the BBC series 'Seven Wonders of the Solar System'

Scott is the co-founder of the citizen science "Solar Stormwatch" project, to track solar eruptions in heliospheric imager data.
