= Jordanova =

Jordanova is a surname. Notable people with this surname include:

- Ludmilla Jordanova (born 1949), British historian and academic
- Vania Jordanova, space physicist
- Vera Jordanova (born 1975), Bulgarian-Finnish model and actress
- Victoria Jordanova (born 1952), American composer, harpist and media artist
