= Chris Scott (cricketer, born 1959) =

English cricketer (born 1959)

Christopher John Scott (born 16 September 1959) is an English former cricketer active from 1975 to 1982 who played for Lancashire. He was born in Swinton, Greater Manchester. He appeared in 46 first-class matches as a lefthanded batsman and wicket-keeper. He scored 262 runs with a highest score of 27* and held 94 catches with 10 stumpings.
