= Heliospheric imager =

A heliospheric imager is a wide-field camera that is designed to image the solar wind in interplanetary space, far from the Sun itself.

== Overview ==
The solar wind is composed of plasma and contains both ions and free electrons. The electrons, in particular, scatter incident sunlight via Thomson scattering, and clouds of plasma can therefore be photographed using visible light. Heliospheric imagers are simple in principle – they are simple visible light cameras placed inside deep optical baffles. However, the solar wind features are extremely faint – as little as 0.1% of the brightness of the background starfield and zodiacal light – and therefore heliospheric imager data require extensive post-processing to remove these backgrounds.

Heliospheric imagers are generally flown in space because the Earth's atmosphere itself interferes with the signal even at night. Terrestrial features such as clouds, aircraft, moonlight, small variations in dust and moisture content of the air column, and even high altitude airglow and aurora, can obscure the desired solar wind signal. Instruments flown to date include the Solar Mass Ejection Imager (SMEI) flown on a USAF satellite in high polar orbit, and the HI imagers that formed part of the SECCHI instrument suite on board NASA's twin STEREO spacecraft in deep space. The concept was first demonstrated in the 1980s via detailed post-processing of photometer data from the two HELIOS spacecraft flown in the 1970s.
