= Antoinette Galvin =

Space physicist

Antoinette Broe Galvin
- Education: University of Maryland
- Scientific career
- Workplaces: University of New Hampshire
- Thesis: Charge states of heavy ions in the energy range in the order of 30-130 keV/Q observed in upstream events associated with the earth's bow shock (1982)

Antoinette (Toni) Galvin is space physicist at the University of New Hampshire. She is known for her research on the solar wind.

== Education and career ==
Galvin earned her B.S. in physics from Purdue University, and has an M.S. and a Ph.D. in physics from the University of Maryland. Galvin was a research faculty member of the University of Maryland before moving to the University of New Hampshire in 1997. As of 2011, Galvin is a research professor in physics and astronomy at the University of New Hampshire and the director of the New Hampshire NASA Space Grant program and the New Hampshire NASA EPSCoR program.

In 2019, Galvin was named a fellow of the American Geophysical Union, who cited her "for exceptional contributions to our understanding of the properties of the solar wind, its solar sources, and its structure in the heliosphere."

== Research ==
Galvin is a space physicist whose research is on heliophysics, the science of the sun. Galvin's early research included working on the Ultra-Low Energy Charge Analyzer (ULECA) instrumentation for two of the NASA-ESA International Sun-Earth Explorer spacecraft (ISEE-1 and ISEE-3) with which she examined the ions upstream of Earth's bow shock and used changes in the charge state of heavy ions to track the solar wind ionization temperature. Galvin has also examined heavy ions in the comet 21P/Giacobini–Zinner. Galvin worked on the Solar Wind Ion Composition Spectrometer (SWICS) instrumentation for the Ulysses spacecraft that was a shared venture between NASA and the European Space Agency. Ulysses enabled Galvin and colleagues to identify interstellar hydrogen and to identify events associated with coronal mass ejections, also known as solar explosions.

Galvin also worked on the Mass Time-of-Flight (MTOF) and Proton Monitor (PM) instrumentation on the NASA-ESA Solar and Heliospheric Observatory (SOHO) mission and on the development of a supra-thermal ion experiment that flew on the NASA-Japan Geotail mission. Galvin was the lead for the Suprathermal Ion Composition Spectrometer (STICS) on the NASA Wind spacecraft. Galvin is the principal investigator for the PLasma and SupraThermal Ion Composition (PLASTIC) instruments on the two Solar Terrestrial Relations Observatory STEREO spacecraft. In 2009, data from PLASTIC provided the solar wind measurements for the first three-dimensional images of a coronal mass ejection from the sun. In 2012, Galvin and colleagues observed an extreme storm which will help establish the conditions that lead to the prediction of sun storms and thereby reduce their impact on communications on Earth. On the Solar Orbiter platform, Galvin is the lead for the group that developed the time of flight section of the Heavy Ion Sensor on the Solar Wind Analyser platform. She is a team member of the HelioSwarm NASA MIDEX mission, currently under development.

=== Selected publications ===
- Gloeckler, G.; Galvin, A. B.; Ipavich, F. M.; Geiss, J.; Balsiger, H.; von Steiger, R.; Fisk, L. A.; Ogilvie, K. W.; Wilken, B. (1993-07-02). "Detection of Interstellar Pick-Up Hydrogen in the Solar System". Science. 261 (5117): 70–73. Bibcode:1993Sci...261...70G. doi:10.1126/science.261.5117.70. ISSN 0036-8075. PMID 17750548. S2CID 46167186.
- von Steiger, R.; Geiss, J.; Gloeckler, G.; Galvin, A. B. (1995-04-01). "Kinetic properties of heavy ions in the solar wind from SWICS/Ulysses". Space Science Reviews. 72 (1): 71–76. Bibcode:1995SSRv...72...71V. doi:10.1007/BF00768756. ISSN 1572-9672. S2CID 189797680.
- Galvin, A. B.; Kistler, L. M.; Popecki, M. A.; Farrugia, C. J.; Simunac, K. D. C.; Ellis, L.; Möbius, E.; Lee, M. A.; Boehm, M.; Carroll, J.; Crawshaw, A. (2008-04-01). "The Plasma and Suprathermal Ion Composition (PLASTIC) Investigation on the STEREO Observatories". Space Science Reviews. 136 (1): 437–486. Bibcode:2008SSRv..136..437G. doi:10.1007/s11214-007-9296-x. ISSN 1572-9672.
- Liu, Ying D.; Luhmann, Janet G.; Kajdič, Primož; Kilpua, Emilia K. J.; Lugaz, Noé; Nitta, Nariaki V.; Möstl, Christian; Lavraud, Benoit; Bale, Stuart D.; Farrugia, Charles J.; Galvin, Antoinette B. (2014-03-18). "Observations of an extreme storm in interplanetary space caused by successive coronal mass ejections". Nature Communications. 5 (1): 3481. arXiv:1405.6088. Bibcode:2014NatCo...5.3481L. doi:10.1038/ncomms4481. ISSN 2041-1723. PMID 24642508. S2CID 11999567.

== Awards and honors ==
- Fellow, American Geophysical Union (2019)
