= Britney Schmidt =

U.S. earth scientist and astrobiologist

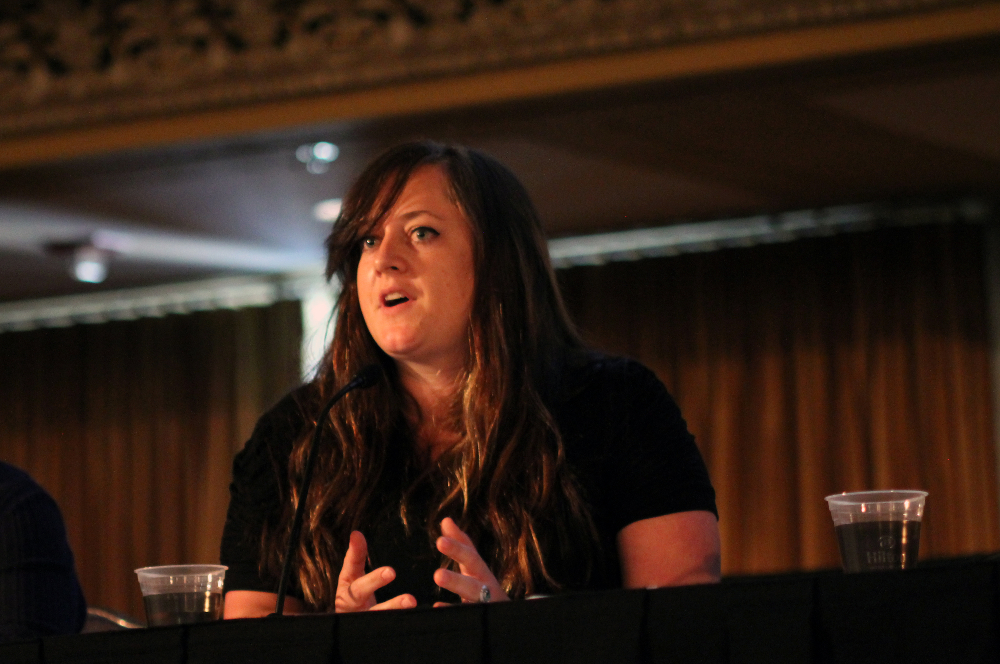
- Schmidt in 2015
- Born: 1982/1983
- Education: University of Arizona (BA, 2005) University of California, Los Angeles (PhD, 2010)
- Awards: Time 100 (2023)
- Scientific career
- Fields: Astronomy, Earth and atmospheric sciences
- Workplaces: University of Texas at Austin (2010) Georgia Institute of Technology (2013-2021) Cornell University (2021-present)

Britney Schmidt (born 1982/1983) is an American earth scientist and astrobiologist at Cornell University. She has conducted research on the melting of ice shelves in Antarctica and studied Jupiter's moon Europa.

In 2023, she was included on the Time 100 list of the most influential people in the world for her research on the Thwaites Glacier. She previously worked at Georgia Tech, and has been involved in projects with NASA. Schmidt was educated at the University of Arizona and University of California, Los Angeles.

== Biography ==
Britney Schmidt was born in 1982 or 1983, and grew up in Tucson, Arizona. She entered the University of Arizona in 2000, where she intended to study agriculture and English. She told The New York Times in 2005 that arriving at Arizona, she felt her professors did not care much about the classes they were teaching, and felt relatively insignificant in the college's large student body. Similarly, Schmidt told NASA that she "didn't feel challenged by what I was learning". This led her to have a self-described "educational identity crisis", and change her major to physics. Schmidt spent a fifth year there and graduated from Arizona with a BA in physics in 2005. Five years later she earned a Ph.D. in geophysics and space physics from the University of California, Los Angeles. In 2011, Schmidt worked as a postdoctoral researcher at the University of Texas at Austin, in their Institute for Geophysics.

From 2013 to 2021 she taught earth and atmospheric sciences at Georgia Tech, first as an assistant professor and from 2019 as an associate professor. In 2021 she was hired to work at Cornell University as an associate professor of astronomy, earth, and atmospheric sciences. As of 2023, she is an associate professor of astronomy in the Cornell University College of Arts and Sciences and earth and atmospheric sciences in the Cornell University College of Engineering. Since 2016 Schmidt has served on the board of directors of The Planetary Society.

== Projects ==
Schmidt's research centers on both terrestrial and planetary sciences. Her work on polar oceans and ice shelves provides incite into important climate change impacts, and also guides her work on icy worlds of the outer Solar System.

Political Activism

While in Atlanta, Schmidt helped the first Jon Ossoff campaign, worked the polls, and has stayed involved with his campaigns through donations.

=== Space research ===
Schmidt began studying Europa, a moon of Jupiter known for having vast oceans, while an undergrad at Arizona. There, she worked with a professor on studies of the moon's lithosphere. When she was a graduate student at UCLA, she worked with Christopher Russell on the Dawn spacecraft mission, and continued research on Europa. Schmidt worked on a team at the University of Texas as a postdoc that found evidence of a vast lake on the moon's surface.

While at Georgia Tech, Schmidt continued to research Europa, particularly focusing on the possibility that there was life on the moon and studying the presence of "chaos terrain" there. As part of this research, she began developing "Icefin", a robot that could drive underwater and collect information, with the eventual intention of sending the robot to Europa.

=== Research on ice shelves ===
Schmidt also used Icefin in research in Antarctica, studying how ice shelves were responding to climate change.

In 2020 Schmidt and a team of scientists used Icefin on Thwaites Glacier, drilling a 600 metres (2,000 ft) hole through ice to reach underneath the glacier. Schmidt continued her ice shelf research at Cornell, co-publishing a paper in early 2023 on data that Icefin had gathered about Thwaites Glacier. The robot found that warm water was permeating weak portions of the glacier, potentially exacerbating the threat of the glacier melting. They also found a lower rate of melting than was previously estimated.

In 2023, she was included on the Time 100 list of the most influential people in the world with Peter Davis for their research on the Thwaites Glacier. In January 2024, Britney was named to the Explorers Club 50 (EC50) as a member of the 2024 class of "fifty people changing the world that the world needs to know about." In September 2024 she was named a laureate of the Blavatnik Awards for Young Scientists.
