= Vania Jordanova =

Space physicist

Vania Koleva Jordanova
- Education: University of Michigan
- Scientific career
- Thesis: Kinetic model of the terrestrial ring current (1995)

Vania Koleva Jordanova is a physicist known for her work on space weather and geomagnetic storms. She was elected a fellow of the American Geophysical Union in 2021.

== Education and career ==
Jordanova received a Ph.D. from the University of Michigan in 1995. During this time, she created "one of the first models to simulate geomagnetic storms." Her research with geomagnetic storms brought the importance of plasma waves from theory to reality.

She started at Los Alamos National Laboratory in 2006 as a technical staff member. She began her time there by working on the Dynamic Radiation Environment Assimilation Model (DREAM) project. In 2014, Jordanova was the director for the Space Hazards Induced near Earth by Large Dynamic Storms (SHIELDS) project which examines hazards from space weather that can cause deleterious impacts on technology on Earth such as radio, television, and cell phones. This model won the R&D 100 Award "for being the world's most advanced tool for predicting geomagnetic storms. The SHIELDS model is important for people who operate satellites, power grids, etc. because it provides advance notice of geomagnetic storms.

On December 15, 2023, Jordanova co-published a research paper with seven other physicists from the Los Almos National Laboratory, School of Space and Environment in Beijing, China, and the Institute for Space-Earth Environmental Research at Nagoya University in Japan. This paper is called, The RAM-SCB model and its applications to Advanced Space Weather Forecasting.

== Selected publications ==
- Ring current investigations : the quest for space weather prediction. Vania K. Jordanova, Raluca Ilie, M. W. Chen. Amsterdam, Netherlands. 2020. ISBN 978-0-12-815572-1. OCLC 1160061500.
- Jordanova, V. K.; Kistler, L. M.; Kozyra, J. U.; Khazanov, G. V.; Nagy, A. F. (1996). "Collisional losses of ring current ions". Journal of Geophysical Research: Space Physics. 101 (A1): 111–126. Bibcode:1996JGR...101..111J. doi:10.1029/95JA02000. ISSN 2156-2202.
- Jordanova, V. K.; Farrugia, C. J.; Thorne, R. M.; Khazanov, G. V.; Reeves, G. D.; Thomsen, M. F. (2001). "Modeling ring current proton precipitation by electromagnetic ion cyclotron waves during the May 14–16, 1997, storm". Journal of Geophysical Research: Space Physics. 106 (A1): 7–22. Bibcode:2001JGR...106....7J. doi:10.1029/2000JA002008. ISSN 2156-2202.
- Kletzing, C. A.; Kurth, W. S.; Acuna, M.; MacDowall, R. J.; Torbert, R. B.; Averkamp, T.; Bodet, D.; Bounds, S. R.; Chutter, M.; Connerney, J.; Crawford, D. (2013). "The Electric and Magnetic Field Instrument Suite and Integrated Science (EMFISIS) on RBSP". Space Science Reviews. 179 (1–4): 127–181. Bibcode:2013SSRv..179..127K. doi:10.1007/s11214-013-9993-6. ISSN 0038-6308. S2CID 119937205.
- Spence, H. E.; Reeves, G. D.; Baker, D. N.; Blake, J. B.; Bolton, M.; Bourdarie, S.; Chan, A. A.; Claudepierre, S. G.; Clemmons, J. H.; Cravens, J. P.; Elkington, S. R. (2013). "Science Goals and Overview of the Radiation Belt Storm Probes (RBSP) Energetic Particle, Composition, and Thermal Plasma (ECT) Suite on NASA's Van Allen Probes Mission". Space Science Reviews. 179 (1–4): 311–336. Bibcode:2013SSRv..179..311S. doi:10.1007/s11214-013-0007-5. ISSN 0038-6308. S2CID 55146276.

== Awards and honors ==
Jordanova was on the Van Allen Probes project team that was awarded a National Aeronautic and Space Administration (NASA) Group Achievement Award in 2013. In 2017, she was awarded the R&D 100 award for her work as the principle editor on the Space Hazards Induced near Earth by Large Dynamic Storms (SHIELDS) project. In 2020, she was named a Laboratory Fellow of the Los Alamos National Laboratory. In 2021 she was elected a fellow of the American Geophysical Union.
