= STEREO =

NASA solar observation mission launched in 2006

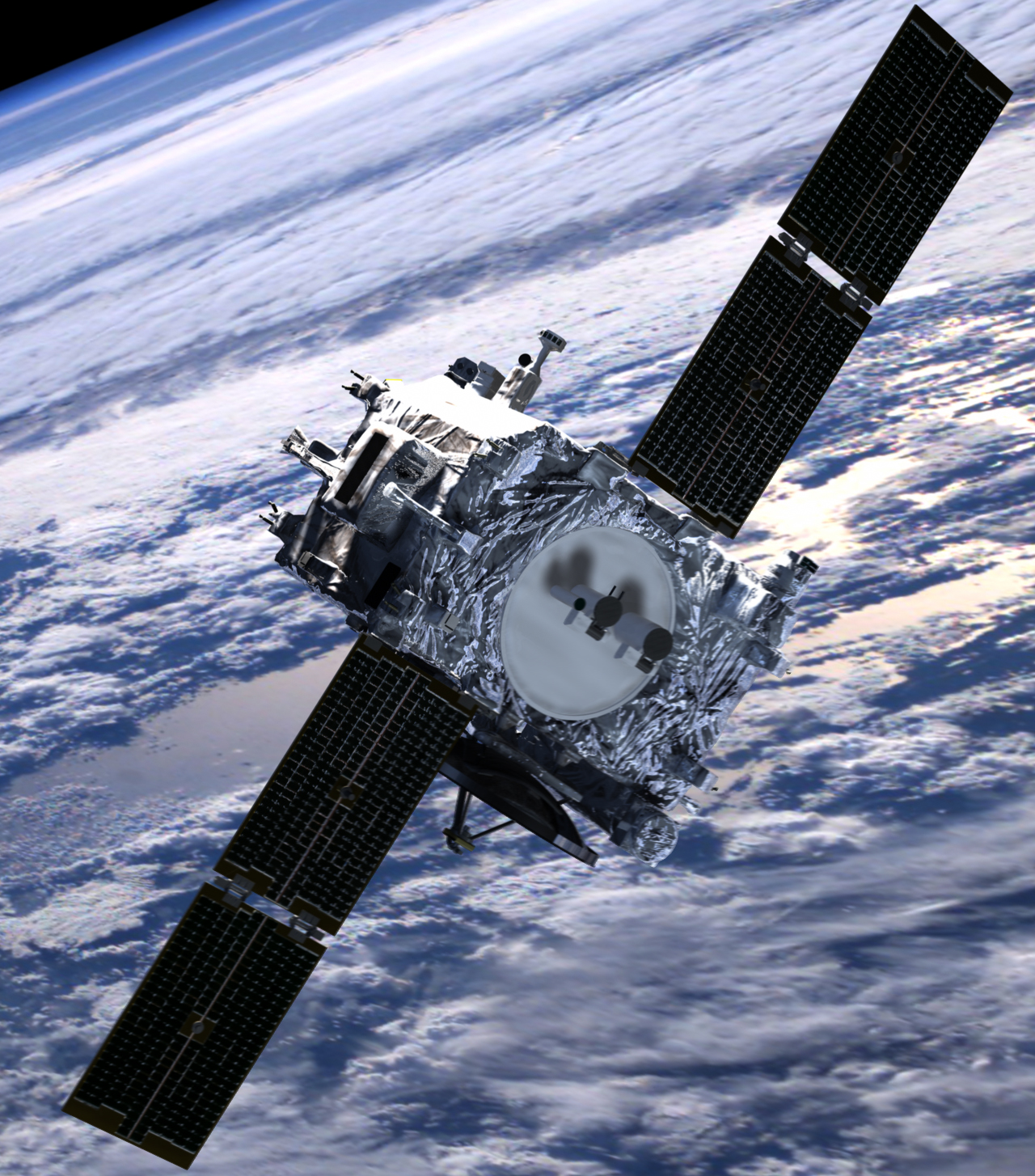
- Illustration of a STEREO spacecraft during solar array deployment
- Mission type: Solar observation
- Operator: NASA
- COSPAR ID: STEREO-A: 2006-047A; STEREO-B: 2006-047Bn
- SATCAT no.: STEREO-A: 29510; STEREO-B: 29511
- Website: stereo.gsfc.nasa.gov stereo.jhuapl.edu
- Mission duration: Planned: 2 years; STEREO-A elapsed: 20 years, 22 days; STEREO-B final: 9 years, 10 months, 30 days

Spacecraft properties
- Manufacturer: Johns Hopkins University Applied Physics Laboratory
- Launch mass: STEREO-A: 620 kg STEREO-B: 620 kg
- Dry mass: 547 kg (1,206 lb)
- Dimensions: 1.14 × 2.03 × 6.47 m 3.75 × 6.67 × 21.24 ft
- Power: 475 W

Start of mission
- Launch date: October 26, 2006, 00:52 UTC
- Rocket: Delta II 7925-10L
- Launch site: Cape Canaveral SLC-17B
- Contractor: United Launch Alliance

End of mission
- Last contact: STEREO-B: September 23, 2016

Orbital parameters
- Reference system: Heliocentric
- Period: STEREO-A: 346 days STEREO-B: 388 days
Instruments
- SECCHI: Sun Earth Connection Coronal and Heliospheric Investigation
- IMPACT: In-situ Measurements of Particles and CME Transients
- PLASTIC: Plasma and Suprathermal Ion Composition
- S/WAVES: STEREO/WAVES
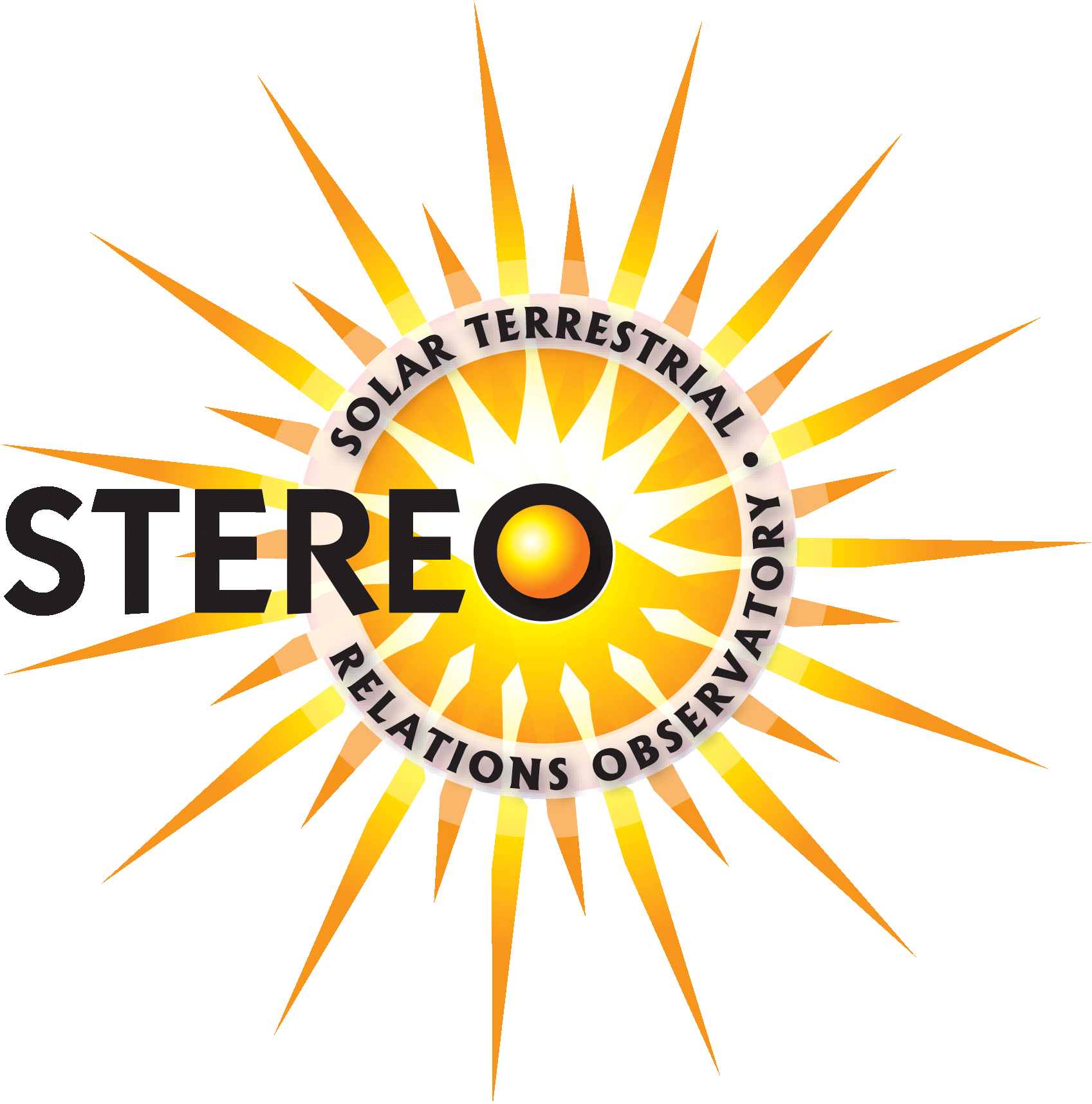
- Mission insignia Solar Terrestrial Probes program

STEREO (Solar TErrestrial RElations Observatory) is a solar observation mission. Two nearly identical spacecraft (STEREO-A, STEREO-B) were launched in 2006 into orbits around the Sun that cause them to respectively pull farther ahead of and fall gradually behind the Earth. This enabled stereoscopic imaging of the Sun and solar phenomena, such as coronal mass ejections.

Contact with STEREO-B was lost in 2014 after it entered an uncontrolled spin preventing its solar panels from generating enough power. It was briefly resumed in 2016 before being interrupted and eventually declared lost.

== Mission profile ==
This introductory video demonstrates STEREO's locations and shows a simultaneous image of the entire Sun.

Animation of STEREO's trajectory

Around the Sun

Relative to the Sun and the Earth

STEREO-A

STEREO-B Earth

Sun

The two STEREO spacecraft were launched at 00:52 UTC on October 26, 2006, from Launch Pad 17B at the Cape Canaveral Air Force Station in Florida on a Delta II 7925-10L launcher into highly elliptical geocentric orbits. The apogee reached the Moon's orbit. On December 15, 2006, on the fifth orbit, the pair swung by the Moon for a gravity assist. Because the two spacecraft were in slightly different orbits, the "ahead" (A) spacecraft was ejected to a heliocentric orbit inside Earth's orbit, while the "behind" (B) spacecraft remained temporarily in a high Earth orbit. The B spacecraft encountered the Moon again on the same orbital revolution on January 21, 2007, being ejected from Earth orbit in the opposite direction from spacecraft A. Spacecraft B entered a heliocentric orbit outside the Earth's orbit. Spacecraft A took 347 days to complete one revolution of the Sun and Spacecraft B took 387 days. The A spacecraft/Sun/Earth angle will increase at 21.650° per year. The B spacecraft/Sun/Earth angle will change −21.999° per year. Given that the length of Earth's orbit is around 940 million kilometres, both craft have an average speed, in a rotating geocentric frame of reference in which the Sun is always in the same direction, of about 1.8 km/s, but the speed varies considerably depending on how close they are to their respective aphelion or perihelion (as well as on the position of Earth). Their current locations are shown here.

Over time, the STEREO spacecraft continued to separate from each other at a combined rate of approximately 44° per year. There were no final positions for the spacecraft. They achieved 90° separation on January 24, 2009, a condition known as quadrature. This was of interest because the mass ejections seen from the side on the limb by one spacecraft can potentially be observed by the in situ particle experiments of the other spacecraft. As they passed through Earth's Lagrangian points L_{4} and L_{5}, in late 2009, they searched for Lagrangian (trojan) asteroids. On February 6, 2011, the two spacecraft were exactly 180° apart from each other, allowing the entire Sun to be seen at once for the first time.

Even as the angle increases, the addition of an Earth-based view, e.g., from the Solar Dynamics Observatory, still provided full-Sun observations for several years. In 2015, contact was lost for several months when the STEREO spacecraft passed behind the Sun. They then started to approach Earth again, with closest approach in August 2023. They will not be recaptured into Earth orbit.

=== Loss of contact with STEREO-B ===
On October 1, 2014, contact was lost with STEREO-B during a planned reset to test the craft's automation, in anticipation of the aforementioned solar "conjunction" period. The team originally thought that the spacecraft had begun to spin, decreasing the amount of power that could be generated by the solar panels. Later analysis of the received telemetry concluded that the spacecraft was in an uncontrolled spin of about 3° per second; this was too rapid to be immediately corrected using its reaction wheels, which would become oversaturated.

NASA used its Deep Space Network, first weekly and later monthly, to try to re-establish communications.

After a silence of 22 months, contact was regained at 22:27 UTC on August 21, 2016, when the Deep Space Network established a lock on STEREO-B for 2.4 hours.

Engineers planned to work and develop software to fix the spacecraft, but once its computer was powered up, there would only have been about 2 minutes to upload the fix before STEREO-B entered failure mode again. Further, while the spacecraft was power-positive at the time of contact, its orientation would drift, and power levels fall. Two-way communication was achieved, and commands to begin recovering the spacecraft were sent through the rest of August and September.

Six attempts at communication between September 27 and October 9, 2016, failed, and a carrier wave was not detected after September 23. Engineers determined that during an attempt to despin the spacecraft, a frozen thruster fuel valve probably led to the spin increasing rather than decreasing. As STEREO-B moved along its orbit, it was hoped that its solar panels may again generate enough power to charge the battery.

Four years after the initial loss of contact, NASA terminated periodic recovery operations effective October 17, 2018.

== Mission benefits ==
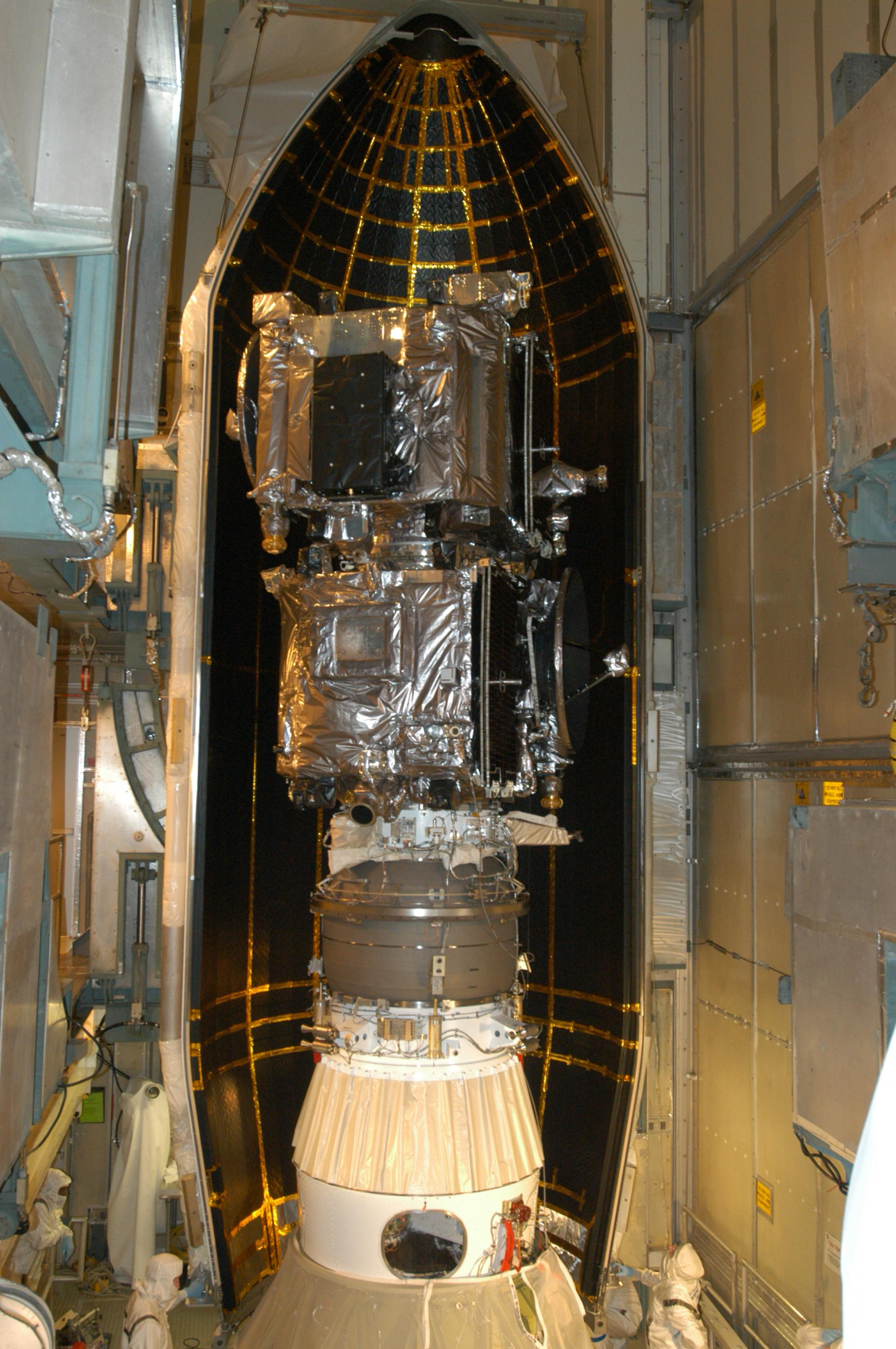
STEREO spacecraft in Delta II fairing

The principal benefit of the mission was stereoscopic images of the Sun. Because the satellites are at different points along the Earth's orbit, but distant from the Earth, they can photograph parts of the Sun that are not visible from the Earth. This permits NASA scientists to directly monitor the far side of the Sun, instead of inferring the activity on the far side from data that can be gleaned from Earth's view of the Sun. The STEREO satellites principally monitor the far side for coronal mass ejections — massive bursts of solar wind, solar plasma, and magnetic fields that are sometimes ejected into space.

Since the radiation from coronal mass ejections, or CMEs, can disrupt Earth's communications, airlines, power grids, and satellites, more accurate forecasting of CMEs has the potential to provide greater warning to operators of these services. Before STEREO, the detection of the sunspots that are associated with CMEs on the far side of the Sun was only possible using helioseismology, which only provides low-resolution maps of the activity on the far side of the Sun. Since the Sun rotates every 25 days, detail on the far side was invisible to Earth for days at a time before STEREO. The period that the Sun's far side was previously invisible was a principal reason for the STEREO mission.

STEREO program scientist Madhulika Guhathakurta expected "great advances" in theoretical solar physics and space weather forecasting with the advent of constant 360° views of the Sun. STEREO's observations are incorporated into forecasts of solar activity for airlines, power companies, satellite operators, and others.

STEREO has also been used to discover 122 eclipsing binaries and study hundreds more variable stars. STEREO can look at the same star for up to 20 days.

On July 23, 2012, STEREO-A was in the path of the Carrington class CME of the solar storm of 2012. This CME, it is estimated, if it had collided with Earth's magnetosphere, would have caused a geomagnetic storm of similar strength to the Carrington Event, the most intense geomagnetic storm in recorded history. STEREO-A's instrumentation was able to collect and relay a significant amount of data about the event without being harmed.

== Science instrumentation ==
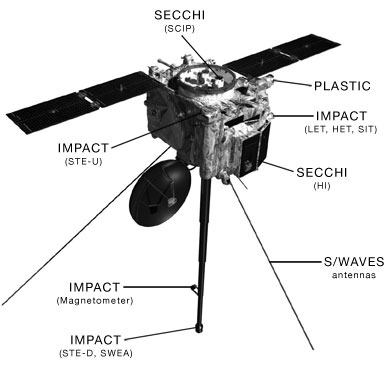
Instrument locations on STEREO

Each of the spacecraft carries cameras, particle experiments and radio detectors in four instrument packages:

- Sun Earth Connection Coronal and Heliospheric Investigation (SECCHI) has five cameras: an extreme ultraviolet imager (EUVI) and two white-light coronagraphs (COR1 and COR2). These three telescopes are collectively known as the Sun Centered Instrument Package or SCIP. They image the solar disk and the inner and outer corona. Two additional telescopes, heliospheric imagers (called the HI1 and HI2), image the space between Sun and Earth. The purpose of SECCHI is to study the 3-D evolution of coronal mass ejections through their full journey from the Sun's surface through the corona and interplanetary medium to their impact at Earth. The principal investigator for SECCHI was Russell Howard.
- In-situ Measurements of Particles and CME Transients (IMPACT), to study energetic particles, the three-dimensional distribution of solar-wind electrons and interplanetary magnetic field. Janet Luhmann was the principal investigator for IMPACT.
- PLAsma and SupraThermal Ion Composition (PLASTIC), led by Antoinette Galvin, to study the plasma characteristics of protons, alpha particles and heavy ions.
- STEREO/WAVES (SWAVES) is a radio-burst tracker to study radio disturbances traveling from the Sun to the orbit of Earth. Jean Louis Bougeret was principal investigator for SWAVES, with co-investigator Michael Kaiser.

== Spacecraft subsystems ==
Each STEREO spacecraft had a dry mass of 547 kg (1,206 lb) and a launch mass of 619 kg (1,364 lb). In their stowed configuration, each had a length, width and height of 2.0 × 1.2 × 1.1 m (6.67 × 4.00 × 3.75 ft). Upon solar-array deployment, its width increased to 6.5 m (21.24 ft). With all of its instrument booms and antennae deployed, its dimensions are 7.5 × 8.7 × 5.9 m (24.5 × 28.6 × 19.2 ft). The solar panels can produce an average of 596 watts of power, and the spacecraft consumes an average of 475 watts.

The STEREO spacecraft are 3-axis-stabilized, and each has a primary and backup miniature inertial measurement unit (MIMU) provided by Honeywell. These measure changes to a spacecraft's attitude, and each MIMU contains three ring laser gyroscopes to detect angular changes. Additional attitude information is provided by the star tracker and the SECCHI Guide Telescope.

STEREO's onboard computer systems are based on the Integrated Electronics Module (IEM), a device that combines core avionics in a single box. Each single-string spacecraft carries two CPUs, one for command and data handling and one for guidance and control. Both are radiation-hardened 25-megahertz IBM RAD6000 processors, based on POWER1 CPUs (predecessor of the PowerPC chip found in older Macintoshes). The computers, slow by current personal computer standards, are typical for the radiation requirements needed on the STEREO mission.

STEREO also carries Actel FPGAs that use triple modular redundancy for radiation hardening. The FPGAs hold the P24 MISC and CPU24 soft microprocessors.

For data storage, each spacecraft carries a solid-state recorder able to store up to 1 gigabyte each. Its main processor collects and stores on the recorder images and other data from STEREO's instruments, which can then be sent back to Earth. The spacecraft have an X-band downlink capacity of between 427 and 750 kbit/s.

== Gallery ==
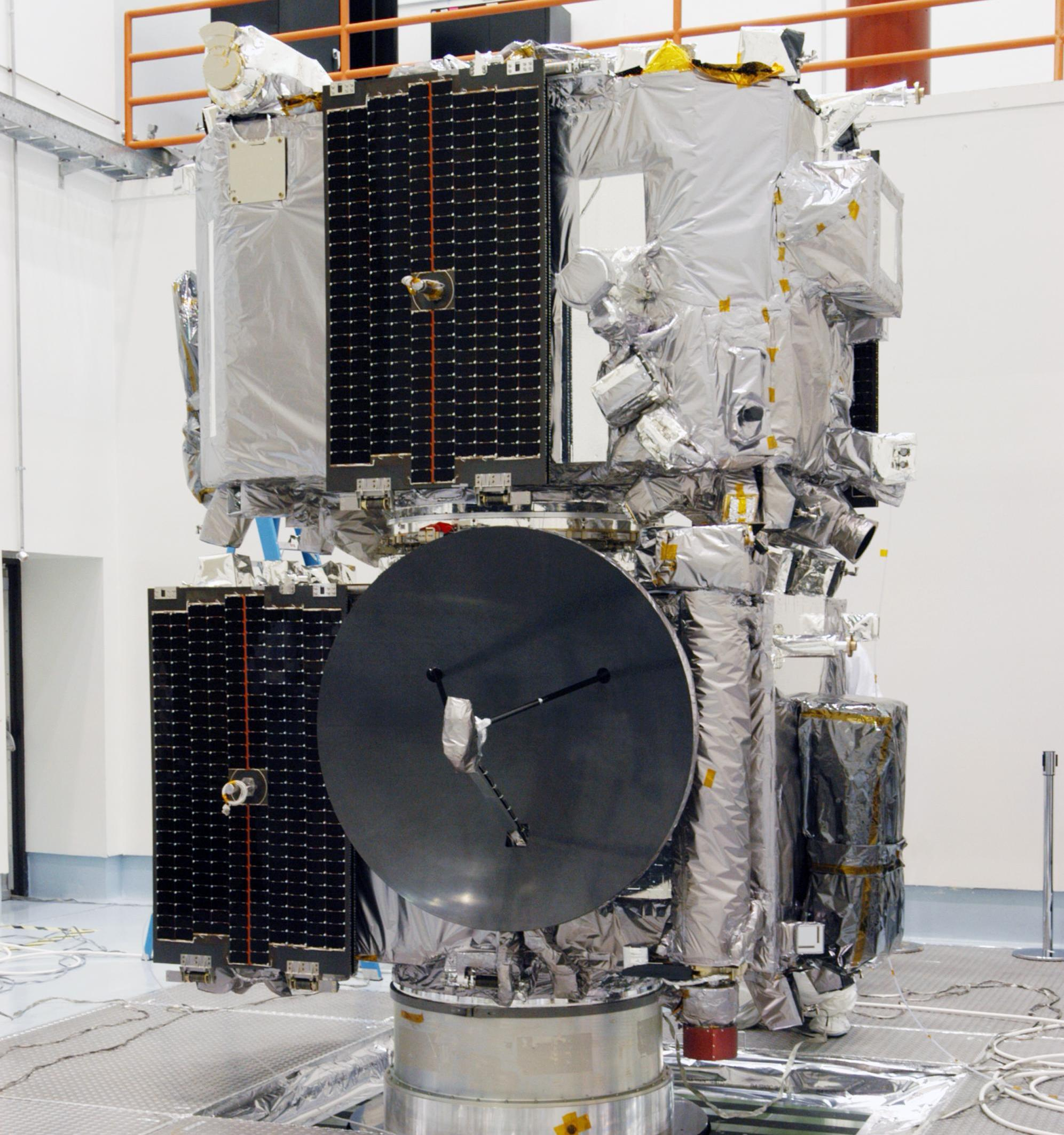
STEREO probes stacked at Astrotech in Florida
August 11, 2006

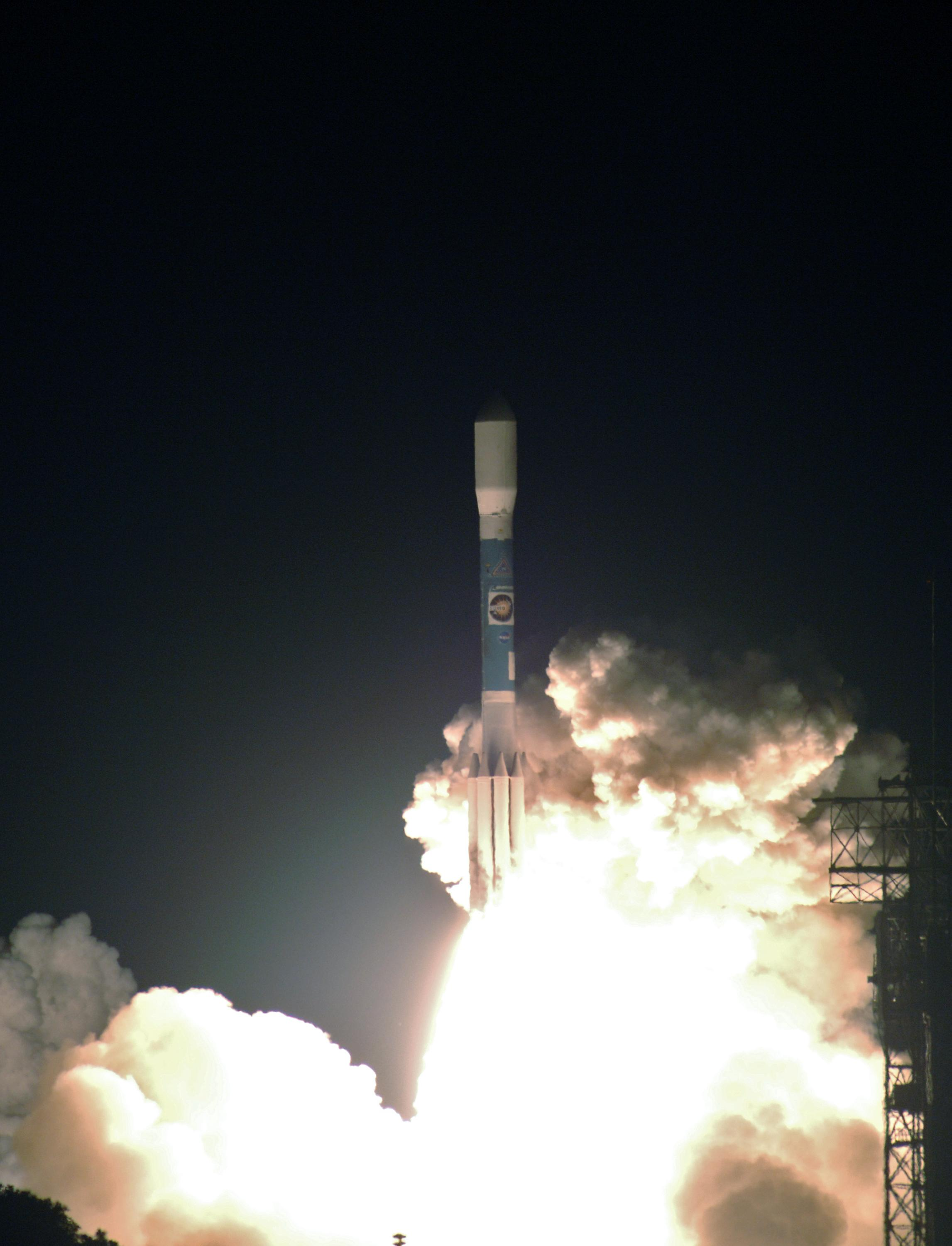
Launch of the STEREO probes on a Delta II rocket
October 26, 2006

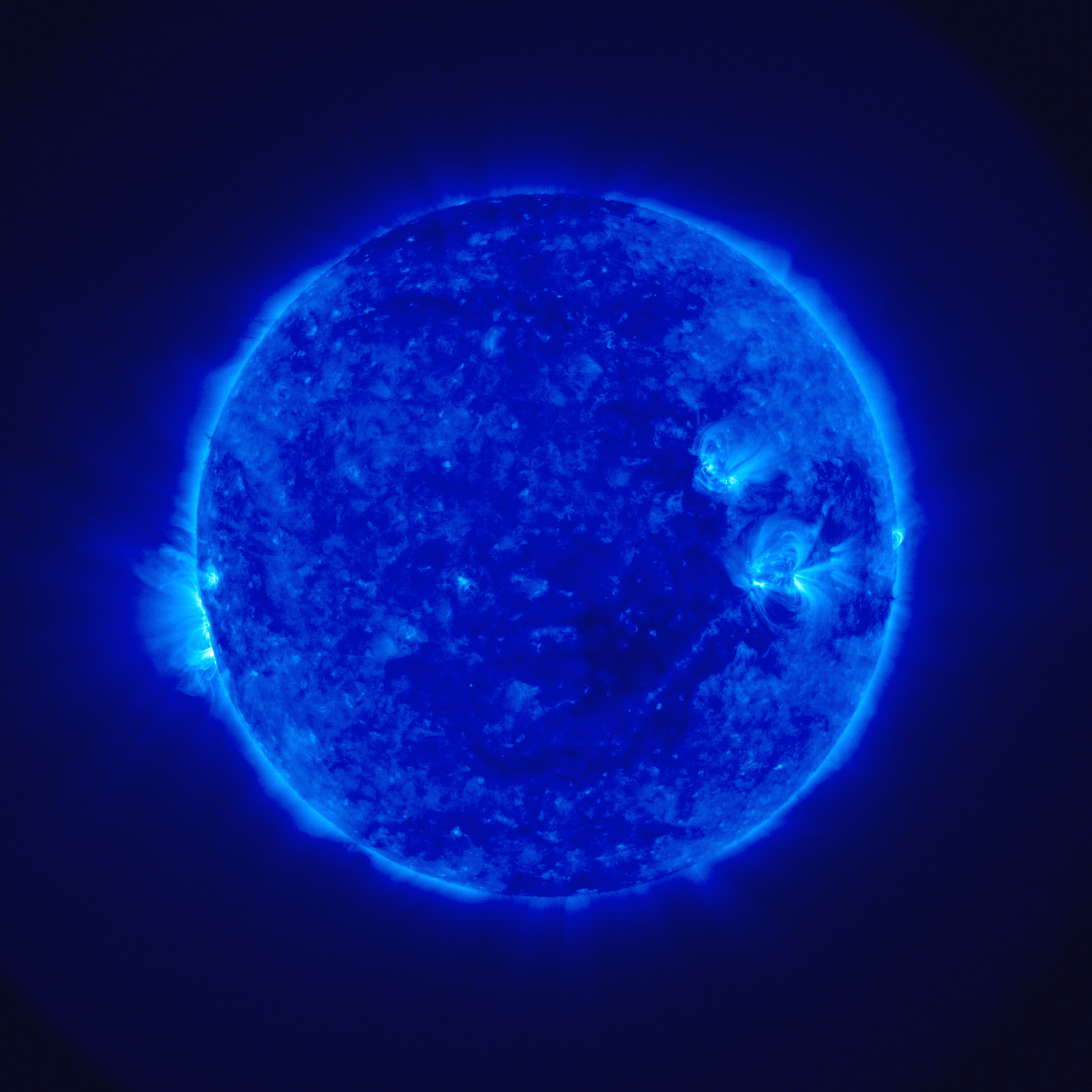
One of the first images of the Sun taken by STEREO
December 4, 2006

A lunar transit of the Sun captured during calibration of STEREO-B's ultraviolet imaging cameras. The Moon appears much smaller than it does from Earth, because the spacecraft–Moon separation was several times greater than the Earth–Moon distance.
February 25, 2007

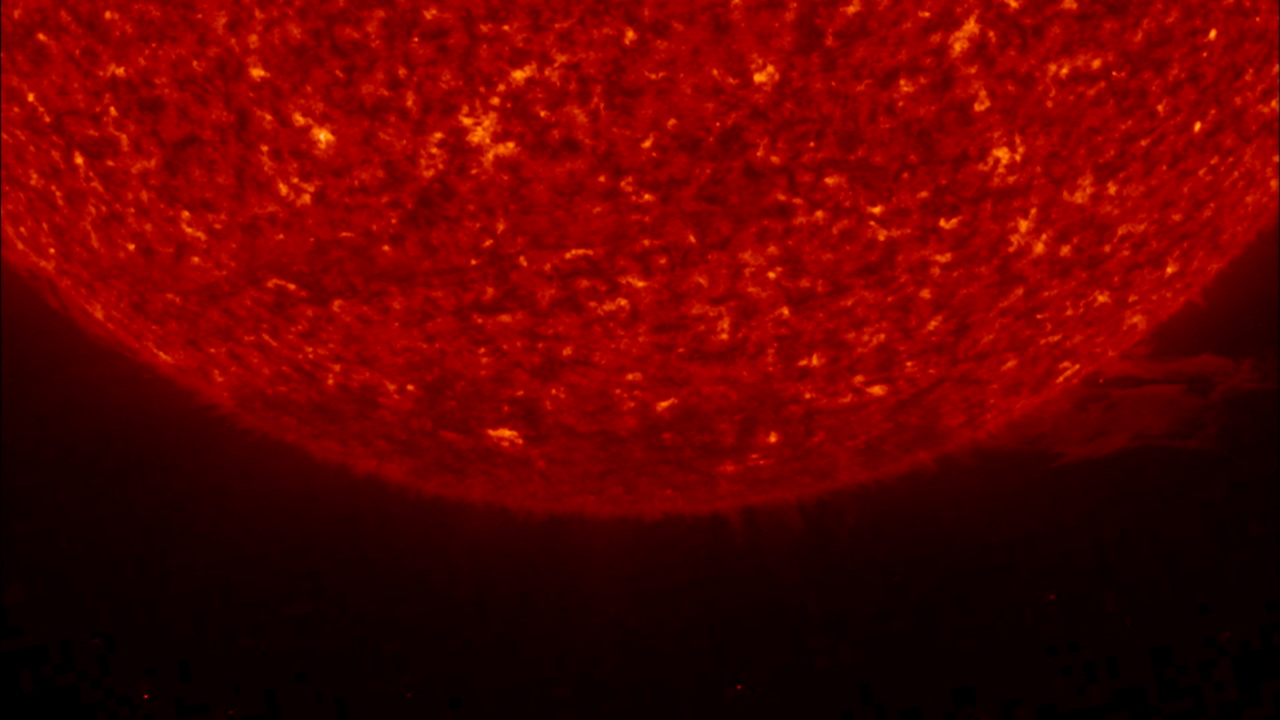
The Sun's South Pole. Material can be seen erupting from the Sun in the lower right side of the image.
March 2007

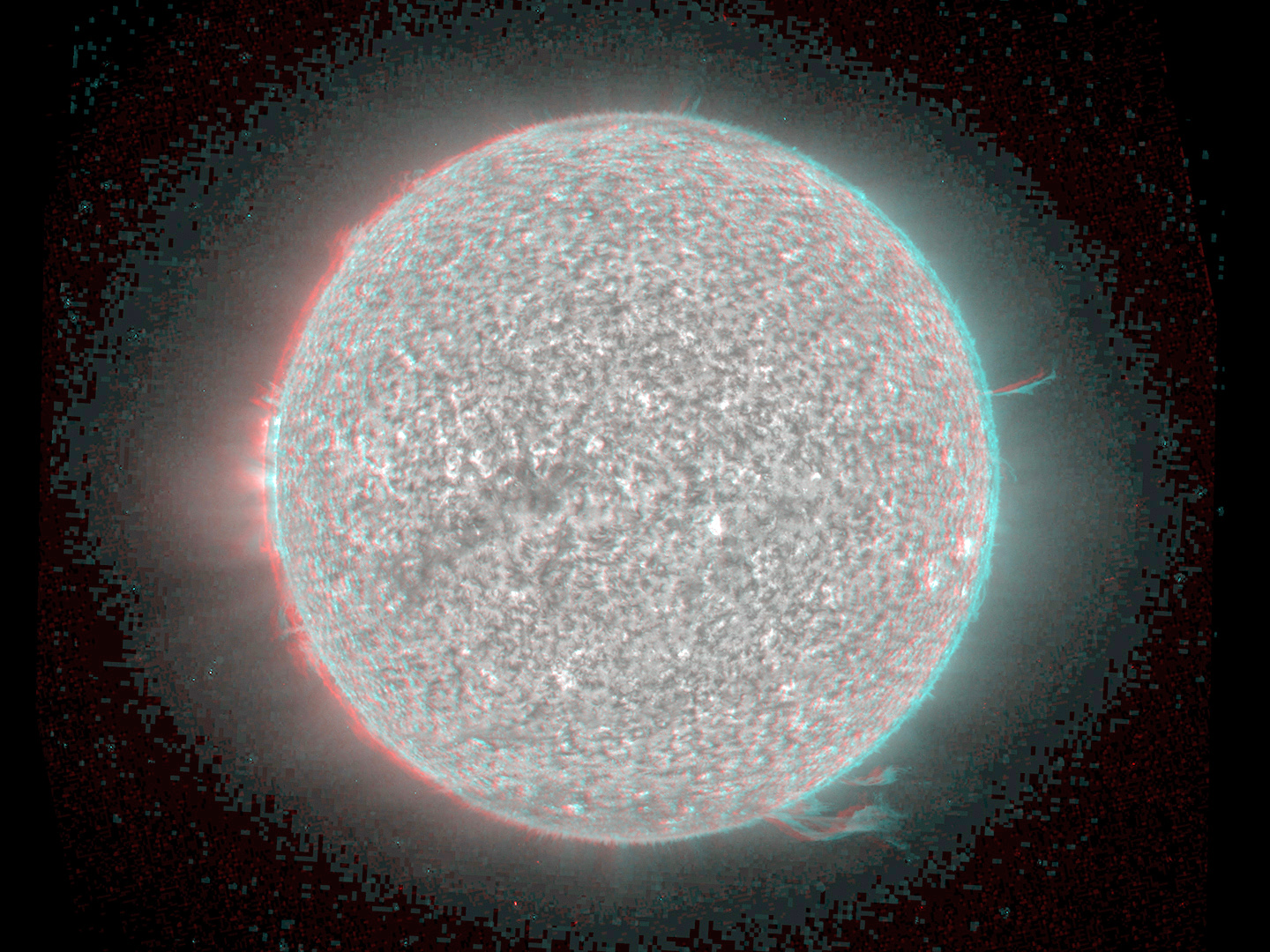
A three-dimensional anaglyph taken by STEREO
March 2007
3D red cyan glasses are recommended to view this image correctly.

A three-dimensional time-for-space wiggle image taken by STEREO
March 2007

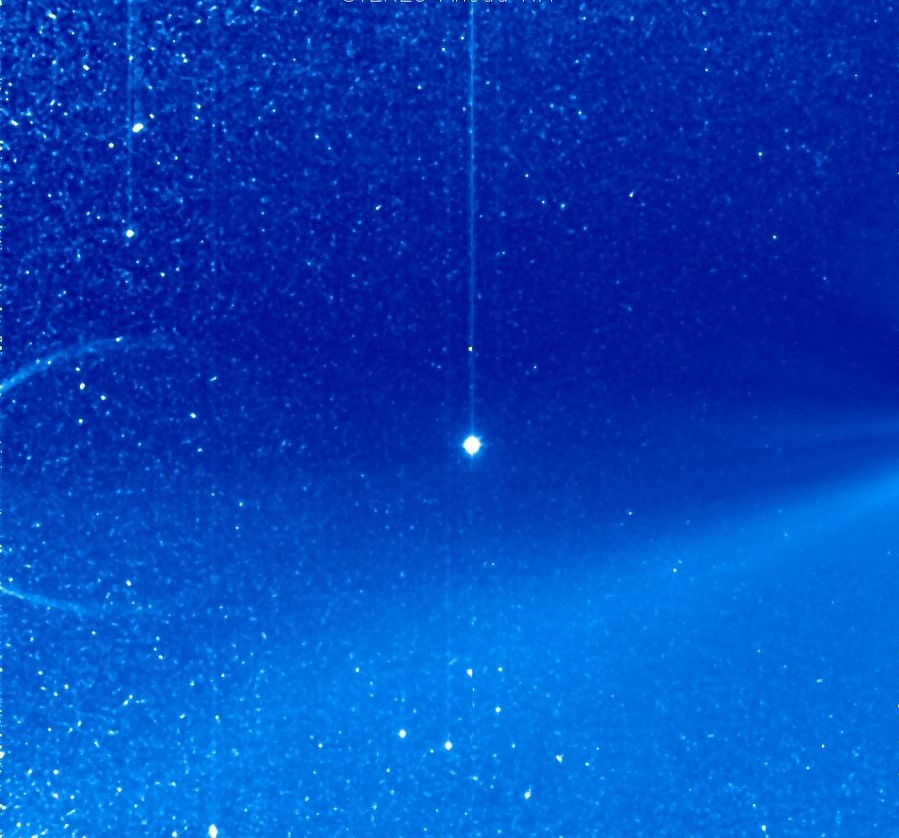
Jupiter as seen by STEREO-A HI1
November 23, 2008

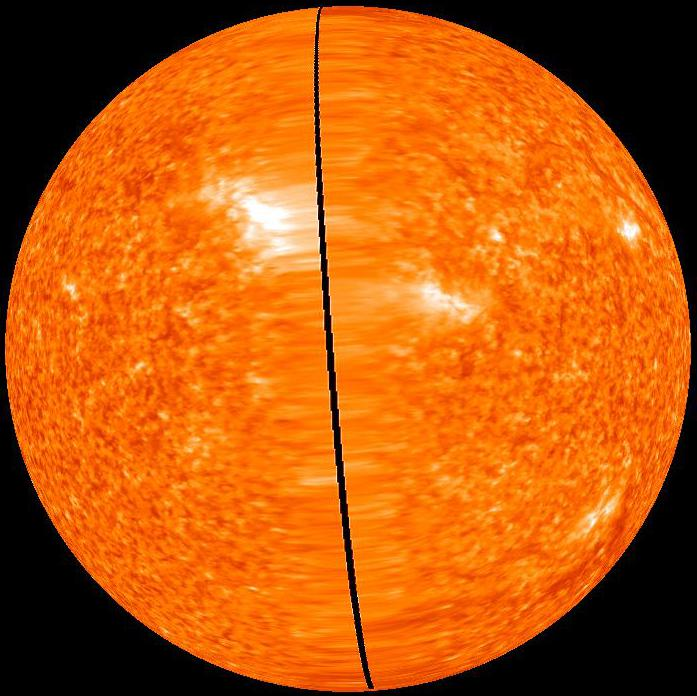
Nearly the entire far side of the Sun
February 2, 2011

Nearly the entire surface of the Sun, taken in extreme ultraviolet at 19.5 nm, with white lines showing solar coordinates (0° is directly towards Earth)
February 10, 2011

A full day of Sun data from the STEREO satellites
February 13–14, 2011

For STEREO's 10th anniversary, Deputy Project Scientist Terry Kucera gives an overview of the mission's top 5 success stories.

== See also ==
- Advanced Composition Explorer (ACE), launched 1997, still operational as of as of 2026.
- Heliophysics
- Living With a Star (NASA program), still ongoing as of 2026.
  - Solar Dynamics Observatory (SDO), launched 2010.
  - Parker Solar Probe, launched August 2018.
- Solar and Heliospheric Observatory (SOHO), launched 1995, still observational as of 2026.
- Solar Orbiter (SolO), launched February 2020.
- TRACE, launched 1998.
- Ulysses, spacecraft launched in 1990.
- Wind, spacecraft launched 1994, still operational as of 2026.
- Zooniverse – Solar Stormwatch
