= Richard B. Dunn Solar Telescope =

Optical telescope dedicated to observing the Sun

Dunn Solar Telescope
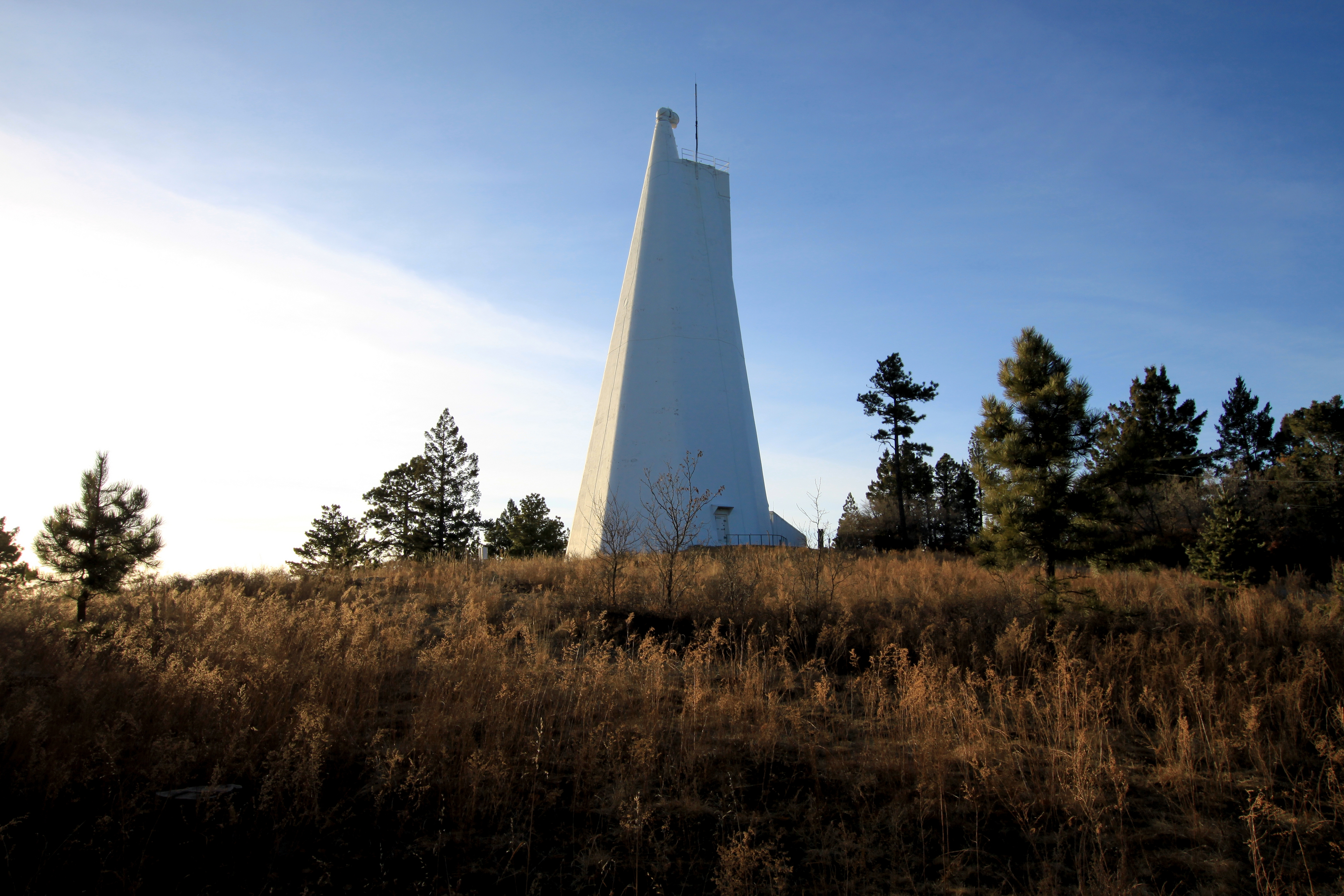
- Alternative names: Vacuum Tower Telescope at Sacramento Peak, Richard B. Dunn Solar Telescope
- Location: New Mexico
- Coordinates: 32°47′14″N 105°49′14″W
- Wavelength: 310 nm (970 THz)–1,000 nm (300 THz)
- Diameter: 76 cm (2 ft 6 in)
- Collecting area: 0.456 m^{2} (4.91 sq ft)
- Focal length: 54.86 m (180 ft 0 in)
- Website: sunspot.solar
- Location within the United States
- Related media on Commons

The Dunn Solar Telescope, also known as the Richard B. Dunn Solar Telescope, was a vertical-axis solar telescope that specialized in high-resolution imaging and spectroscopy. It is located at Sacramento Peak in Sunspot, New Mexico. It was the main telescope at the Sunspot Solar Observatory, operated by New Mexico State University in partnership with the National Solar Observatory through funding from the National Science Foundation, the state of New Mexico, and private funds from other partners. It was used by astrophysicists worldwide to study the Sun and how it affects Earth. In February 2026, the U.S. National Science Foundation announced that the telescope would be dismantled and the Sacramento Peak site restored following the discovery of a liquid mercury leak in the facility and subsequent safety and environmental concerns.

Completed in 1969, the telescope was upgraded with high-order adaptive optics in 2004 and was a versatile astrophysical observatory that served as a test platform for developing new instrumentation and technologies.

== Telescope ==
Schematic cross section of the telescope

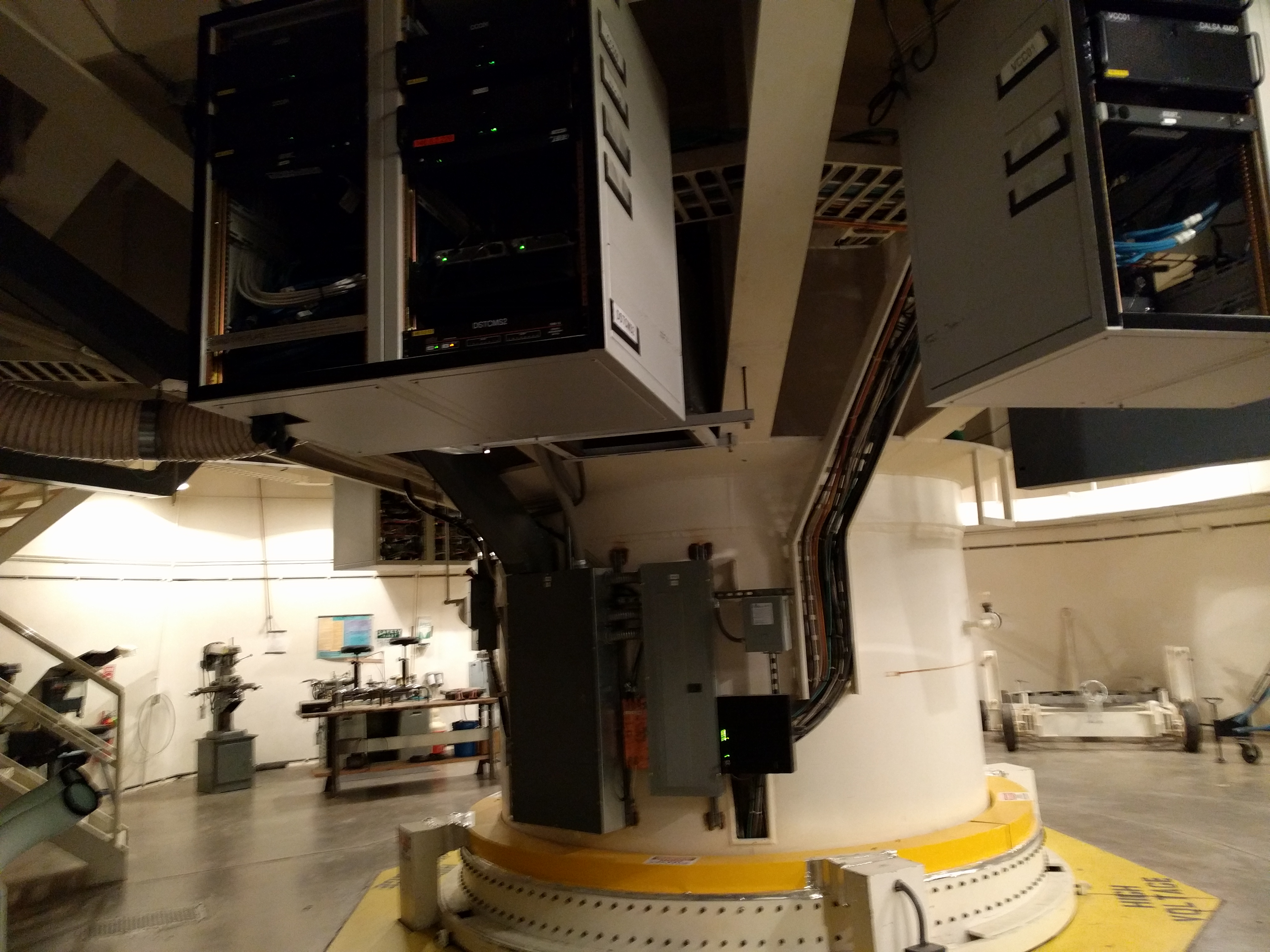
Computers are mounted below the main observation room.

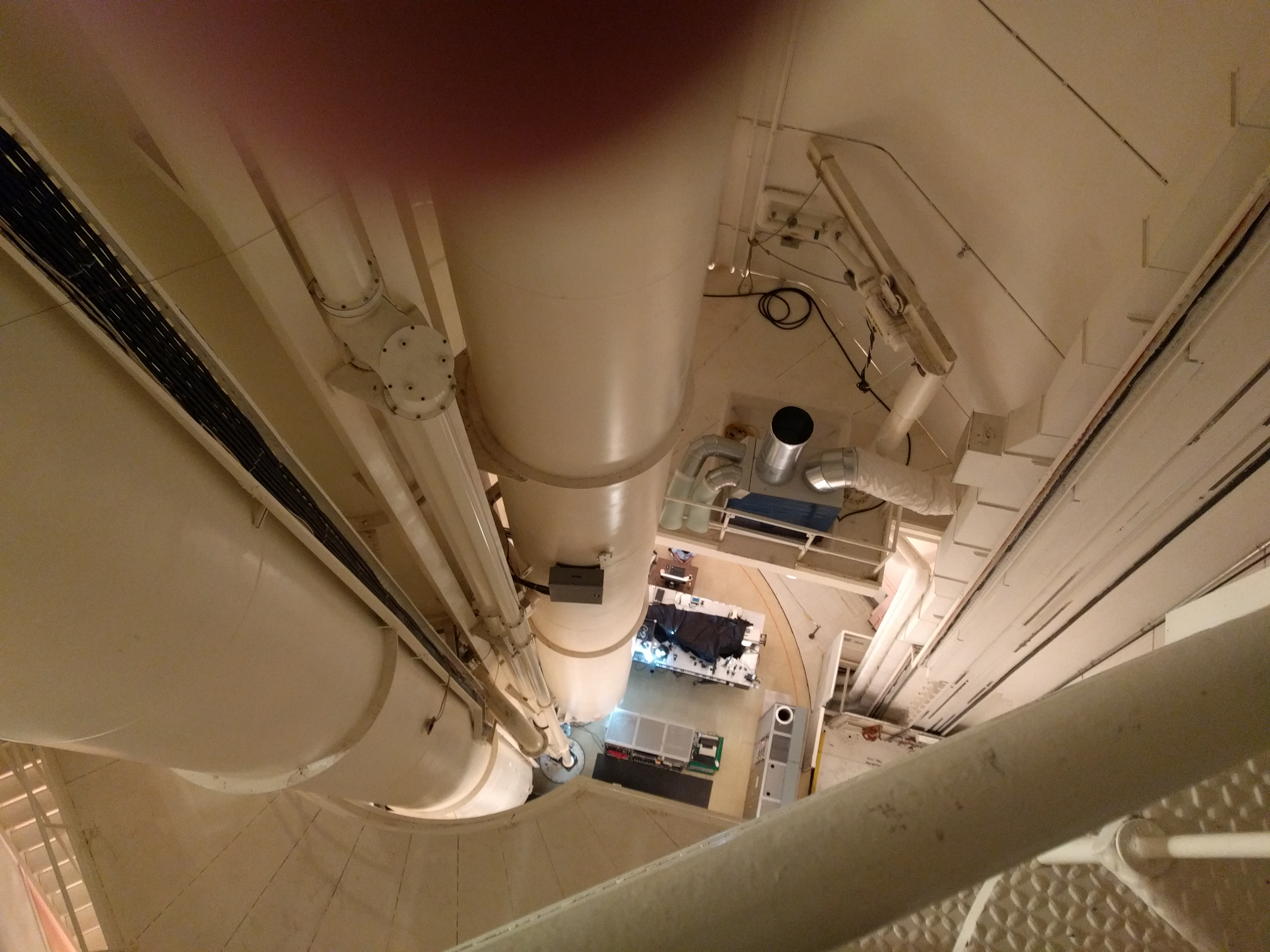
View from far above the observation room

The Dunn Solar Telescope specialized in solar high-resolution imaging and spectroscopy. These observations allowed solar astronomers worldwide to obtain a better understanding of the Sun. Scientists and engineers used the telescope to investigate a range of solar activities, often in concert with satellites or rocket launches, and to develop new technologies for the 4-meter Daniel K. Inouye Solar Telescope.

The telescope was inaugurated in 1969 as the world's premier high spatial resolution optical solar telescope. Its horizontal, rotating 40-foot-diameter (12 m) observing platform allowed instruments to be mounted separately from the telescope itself. It had two high-order adaptive optics benches to compensate for blurring caused by Earth's atmosphere.

The whole building from top to bottom is a single instrument. More than half the entire building is underground – the tower extends 136 feet (41 m) feet above ground, while the lowest excavated point (the bottom of the sump) is 228 feet (69 m) below ground. Enclosed within the concrete tower is a vertical vacuum tube with 3-foot-thick walls.

The optical path starts at a heliostat on top of the tower. An entrance window at the top of the tower, and two mirrors, reflect sunlight down the vacuum tube to the 64-inch primary mirror, 193 feet (59 m) underground. The primary mirror focuses the light and reflects it back up, where it exits the vacuum tube through six quartz optical windows in the floor of an optical laboratory at ground level.

The telescope's entire optical system – from the top of the tower to the base of its underground portion, plus the 40-foot-diameter (12 m) observing room floor – is contained within the vacuum tube. The optics are evacuated to eliminate distortion due to convection in the telescope that would otherwise be caused by the great heat produced by focusing sunlight.

The interior vacuum tube, which weighs more than 250 tons, is suspended from the top of the tower by a mercury float bearing that contains 10 tons of mercury. This bearing allows the entire vacuum tube to be rotated, compensating for the apparent rotation of the image as the Sun rises into the sky. The bearing, in turn, is hung on three bolts, each only 76 millimeters (3.0 in) in diameter. Despite the size and weight, much of the telescope can be controlled and monitored from a single control room, off to one side of the main instrument observing table.

== Instruments ==
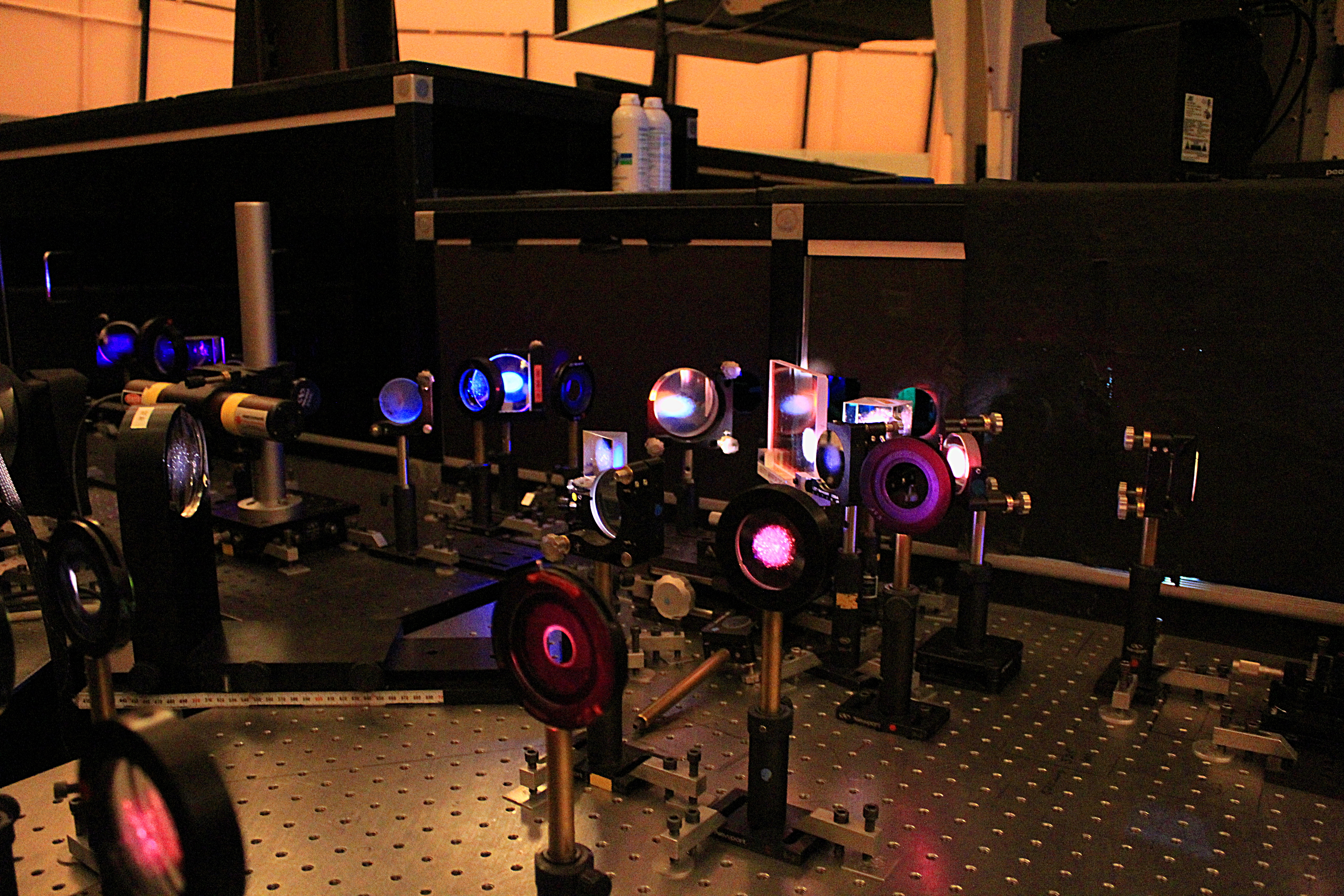
Instruments at the Dunn Solar Telescope

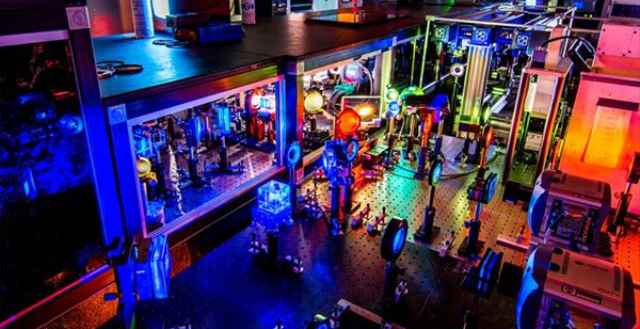
Light passing into instruments at the Dunn Solar Telescope

The Dunn Solar Telescope had a rotating optical bench, which could be configured to multiple observing setups, depending on the requirements of the science under study. The four most widely used instruments, often used together in one complex observing setup, were:

=== Facility Infrared Spectropolarimeter (FIRS) ===
The Facility Infrared Spectropolarimeter is a multi-slit spectropolarimeter made specifically for the Dunn Solar Telescope to study magnetism on the solar surface. The instrument samples adjacent slices of the solar surface using four parallel slits to achieve high cadence, diffraction-limited, precision spectropolarimetry. Up to four spectral lines at visible and infrared wavelengths, covering four different heights in the solar atmosphere, can be observed simultaneously. It can be optimized to provide simultaneous spectral coverage at visible (3,500 – 10,000 Å) and infrared (9,000 – 24,000 Å) wavelengths through the use of a unique dual-armed design. It was "designed to capture the Fe I 6302 Å and Fe I 15648 Å or He I 10830 Å lines with maximum efficiency."

=== Spectro-Polarimeter for Infrared and Optical Regions (SPINOR) ===
The Spectro-Polarimeter for Infrared and Optical Regions performs achromatic lens Stokes polarimetry across several visible and infrared spectral regions. Completed in 2005, it was designed to act as 'experimental oriented' instrument, built with a flexibility to allow for the combination of any many spectral lines, "limited only by practical considerations (e.g., the number of detectors available, space on the optical bench, etc.)".

=== Interferometric Bidimensional Spectro-polarimeter (IBIS) ===
The Interferometric Bidimensional Spectro-polarimeter (IBIS) is a dual interferometer, imaging spectropolarimeter. It uses a series of precise piezoelectric tuning to rapidly scan selected spectral lines within the 550 and 860 nm range. This creates a time series of high-fidelity imaging, spectroscopy, and polarimetry of the Sun. It has a large circular field-of-view combined with high spectral (R ≥ 200,000), spatial ≃ 0.2″) and temporal resolution (several frames per second).

=== Rapid Oscillations in the Solar Atmosphere (ROSA) ===
The Rapid Oscillations in the Solar Atmosphere (ROSA) instrument is a single-controlled system of six imaging fast-readout CCD cameras. The full chip on each camera can be read out 30 frames per second, and all the cameras are triggered from one control system. As such, it provides the ability to image multiple layers of the photosphere and chromosphere simultaneously. At its installation in 2010, it generated up to 12 TB of data per day, making it one of the largest datasets in ground-based solar astronomy at the time.

=== Other ===
In addition, some older instruments were available, although by then rarely used:

- Universal Birefringent Filter (UBF)
- Advanced Stokes Polarimeter (ASP)
- Diffraction-Limited Spectro-Polarimeter (DLSP)

== Scientific discoveries, technologies, and scientists ==
- Inferring telescope polarization properties through spectral lines without linear polarization. Derks, A., Beck, C., Martínez Pillet, V., 2018. Astronomy and Astrophysics volume 615, A22 (2018)
- Adaptation of Dunn Solar Telescope for Jovian Doppler spectro imaging. Underwood, T.A., Voelz, D., Schmider, F.-X., Jackiewicz, J., Dejonghe, J., Bresson, Y., Hull, R., Goncalves, I., Gualme, Pa., Morand, F., Preis O., SPIE Optical Engineering 10401Y (2017)
- Solar coronal magnetic fields are derived using seismology techniques applied to omnipresent sunspot waves. Jess et al., 2016. Cover Article of Nature Physics, Volume 12 Issue 2, February 2016.
- Solar Multi-Conjugate Adaptive Optics at the Dunn Solar Telescope. Rimmele, T., Hegwer, S., Richards, K., Woeger, F., 2008, Multi-Conjugate Adaptive Optics.
- Speckle interferometry with adaptive optics corrected solar data. Wöger, F., von der Lühe, O., Reardon, K., 2008, Speckle Interferometry.

== History ==
A design for a Solar Vacuum Tower Telescope was started by the architect and engineer Charles W. Jones in 1963. Construction on the final building started in 1966 under the U.S. Army Corps of Engineers and ended in 1967, at a cost of about $3 million, with the architectural firm of Roghlin and Baran, Associates. Richard B. Dunn, for whom the instrument was eventually dedicated, wrote an article in Sky & Telescope about the completion of the instrument in 1969. As quoted from the article: "In our design we wanted most of all to eliminate problems of local seeing, which are discussed at every meeting on solar instrumentation. Solar astronomers worry about turbulence caused by the slot in the observatory dome, heating of the dome surfaces, heating of the telescope, local convection, and turbulence within the optical system...In our case, the dome was eliminated. We put a window high up on a 135-foot pyramidal tower and then evacuated the air from the entire telescope inside the tower. The latter reduces the effects of local convection and the vacuum eliminates the internal turbulence and seeing problems. Also, it provides the comfort of a heated observing room [...]"

The tower telescope was originally dedicated on October 15, 1969, and renamed in 1998 after Richard B. Dunn. A plaque at the facility reads: "Named in honor of one of solar astronomy's most creative instrument builders, this vacuum tower telescope is the masterpiece of Richard B. Dunn's long scientific career at Sacramento Peak Observatory (1998). Construction of the vacuum tower used for the DST significantly impacted future solar instruments: So sharp were the images formed from this type of solar telescope, that almost every large solar telescope built since then has been based on the vacuum tower concept."

== Closure and demolition ==
In February 2026, the U.S. National Science Foundation (NSF) announced that it would proceed with demolition and site restoration at the Sacramento Peak Observatory in Sunspot, New Mexico, following the discovery of a liquid mercury leak in the Richard B. Dunn Solar Telescope building. The observatory and visitor center were closed for safety and environmental reasons.

NSF determined that removing and safely disposing of the telescope's mercury would render the facility inoperable. Following remediation, the telescope will be dismantled and the site restored, with plans to develop an educational exhibit highlighting the scientific legacy of the Dunn Solar Telescope and Sacramento Peak Observatory.

Between July 23 and August 1, 2026, NSF drained the liquid mercury from the telescope. In August 2026 NSF said mercury had bonded to metal surfaces throughout the interior vacuum structure, and that its contractors had judged complete demolition the safest way to clean it up, to be preceded by a survey of hazardous materials including mercury, lead and asbestos. In October 2026 the Forest Service said demolition would begin in 2027.

== See also ==
- List of solar telescopes
- List of largest optical telescopes in the 20th century
