= James McAteer =

American solar physicist

R. T. James McAteer
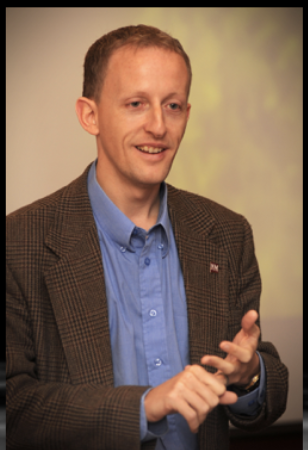
- McAteer, teaching at NMSU
- Born: Ballymena
- Education: Queen's University Belfast; Queen's University Belfast
- Known for: Academic executive leadership
- Office: Provost of New Mexico State University
- Awards: National Science Foundation Career, National Academy of Sciences.
- Scientific career
- Fields: Astrophysics
- Workplaces: New Mexico State University; Sunspot Solar Observatory; Goddard Space Flight Center; Trinity College Dublin
- Thesis: Low Frequency Oscillations of the Solar Atmosphere (2003)

R.T. James McAteer is a senior academic executive with more than a decade of university leadership experience spanning system-wide academic affairs, faculty success, student success, research development, academic innovation, shared governance, and institutional strategy. As of 2026, he is serving as Deputy Provost for Academic Affairs at New Mexico State University and leads across all areas of Academic Affairs, policy management, faculty relations, strategic planning, and resource management in the Office of the Provost.

He serves as the vice-chair and treasurer and a member of the governing board for AURA.

He is an American solar physicist, and tenured professor of astronomy. His academic research lies in studies of the coronal heating problem and space weather. McAteer is the author of two book "The Planets", and "Fields, Flows, and Flares", and has published over 150 research articles, with an h-index of 45 placing him in the top 2% of scientists natonwide in USA.

== Academy leadership ==
Dr McAteer was the Interim Provost and Chief Academic Officer at New Mexico State University in 2026. He was first appointed as the inaugural Senior Associate Provost for faculy success at NMSU in August 2021, and promoted to Deputy Provost for all of Academic Affairs in 2024. Dr McAteer was Department chair of Astronomy from 2021 to 2022, including Director of both Apache Point Observatory and Sloan Digital Sky Survey feom 2016.

In 2020 he was appointed to the New Mexico State Commission for Space History. by the governor of New Mexico.

From 2016 to 2021 he was the Director of Sunspot Solar Observatory.

== Education ==
McAteer graduated from Queen's University Belfast with a master's in physics with astrophysics in 2000. He completed his Ph.D. from Queen's University Belfast with this thesis Low Frequency Oscillations of the Solar Atmosphere in 2004.

== Scientific Career ==
McAteer is a professor of astronomy at New Mexico State University. After completing his thesis, he moved to NASA Goddard Space Flight Center from 2004 to 2008, as a NASA STEREO scientist. He won a European Union Marie Curie Fellowship in 2008, which he took at Trinity College Dublin. He started at New Mexico State University in 2010, and became the director of the newly formed Sunspot Solar Observatory in 2016.

He is noted for wide-ranging contributions to solar physics and space plasma physics, including chromospheric heating, space weather and turbulence. His research includes cross disciplinary papers in image processing, computer vision and big data. His research includes the subjects of spectropolarimetry, seismology, and heliophysics. He was awarded a NSF Career award in 2013 for combining his research and teaching efforts around studies of the Sun.

== National Recognition ==
He is the Vice-Chair, Treasuter, and Member of the Board for AURA.

As a member of the National Academy of Science, he was an author of the 2020-2023 Decadel Survey in Astrophysics.

In 2019 he authored "The Planets", an introduction to the solar system for University general education classes. In 2025 he authored "Fields, Flows, and Flares", a graduate level textbook in Astrophysics.

He was awarded the NMSU "Truly Innovative Teaching" in Teaching in 2022, the NMUS Global Initiative in Service in 2016, and the Career Research award in Research in 2014.
