= John Wainwright Evans =

American solar astronomer

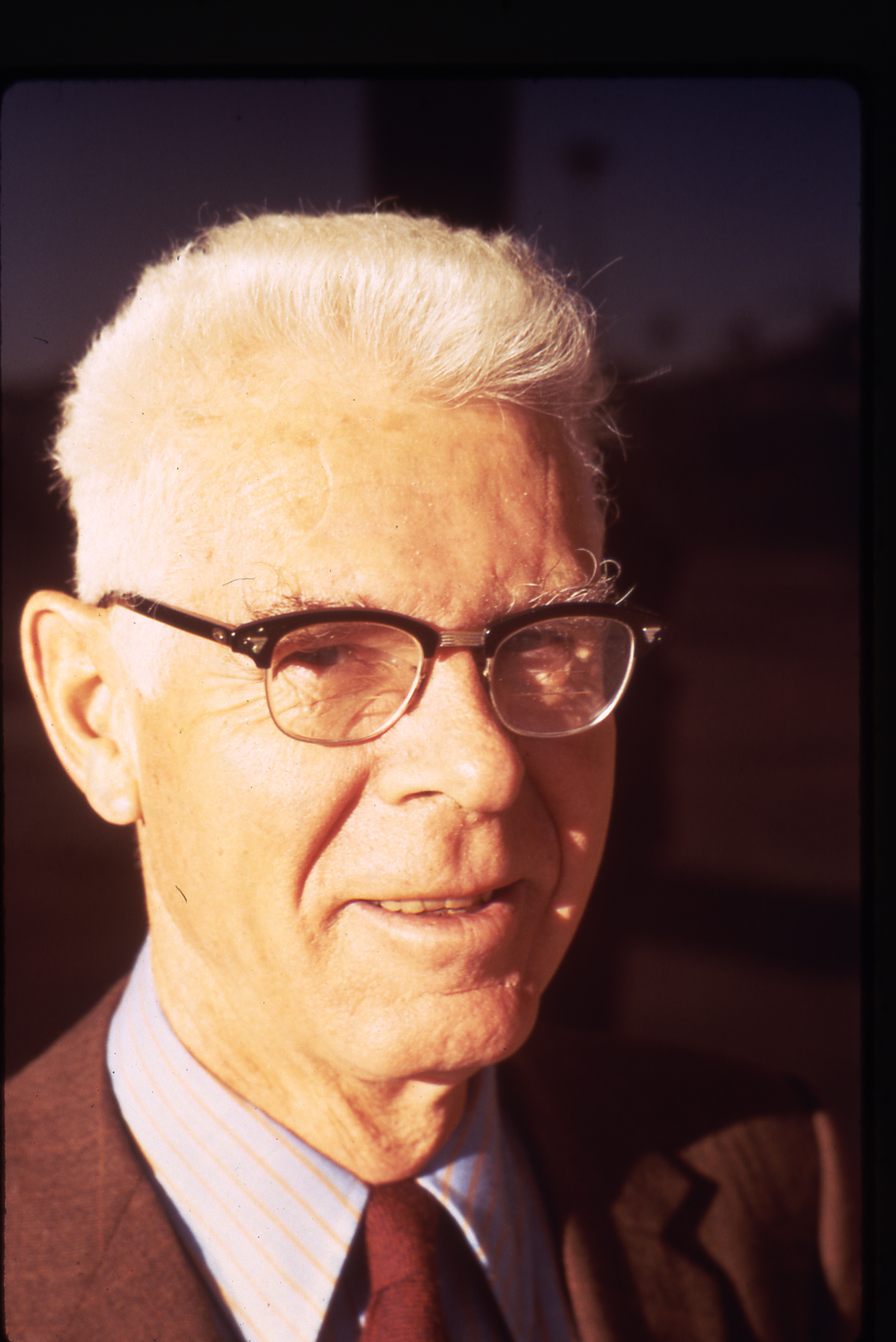
- Evans in 1973
- Born: May 14, 1909; New York City, New York, U.S.
- Died: October 31, 1999 (aged 90); Santa Fe, New Mexico, U.S.
- Known for: Evans Solar Facility
- Spouse: Betty Evans
- Awards: Newcomb Cleveland Prize (1957); Department of Defense Distinguished Civilian Service Award (1965); George Ellery Hale Prize (1982)
- Scientific career
- Fields: Astronomy

John Wainwright Evans (May 14, 1909 – October 31, 1999) was an American solar astronomer born in New York City. He spent much of his career studying the sun and working with optics both of which earned him awards. The Evans Solar Facility at Sacramento Peak was named after him. Evans died in a murder–suicide with his wife in 1999.

== Education ==
Evans graduated from Swarthmore College in 1932 with a bachelor's degree in mathematics, and 1936 from Harvard University with a master's degree after spending some time in the University of Pennsylvania's astronomy department. In 1938 he was awarded a doctorate in astronomy by Harvard.

== Career ==
Evans taught for a year at the University of Minnesota, then at Mills College. While teaching in Oakland he worked at the Chabot Observatory and was appointed assistant professor. There he independently and belatedly invented the Lyot filter. In 1942 Evans moved to University of Rochester's Institute of Optics and developed optics for the military effort.

Between 1946 and 1952 he served as assistant superintendent of the High Altitude Observatory, working in both Boulder and Climax, Colorado. In 1952, he became the first director of the United States Air Force's new Upper Air Research Observatory, located at Sacramento Peak in southern New Mexico. The facility he directed was renamed the National Solar Observatory after the National Science Foundation took over responsibility for it in 1976. As director of the observatory Evans chose the name Sunspot, New Mexico, for the post office and community where the observatory was located.

== Awards ==
While working at the National Solar Observatory, Evans was awarded

- The Newcomb Cleveland Prize of the American Association for the Advancement of Science (1957)
- Fellowship of the American Academy of Arts and Sciences (1964)
- The Department of Defense Distinguished Civilian Service Award (1965)
- An Honorary Doctor of Science at University of New Mexico (1967)
- The Guenter Loeser Memorial Award by the Air Force Cambridge Research Laboratories (1967)
- The Rockefeller Award for Distinguished Public Service (1969)
- An Honorary Doctor of Science at Swarthmore College (1970)
- An Outstanding Achievement Award, Air Force Office of Aerospace Research (1970)

Evans retired from paid employment in 1974. After retiring, Evans was awarded George Ellery Hale Prize of the Solar Physics Division of the American Astronomical Society in 1982, and the David Richardson Medal of the Optical Society of America in 1987 for distinguished work in applied optics. In 1987 the Evans Solar Facility was named in his honor.

== Death ==
Evans died on October 31, 1999, at his home in Santa Fe, New Mexico, as the perpetrator in a murder–suicide with his 89-year-old wife Betty.

== Bibliography ==
Evans wrote a number of astronomy related books and papers.

- Evans, John Wainwright, (1938), The Distribution of Stars and Absorbing Material in the Perseus-Cassiopeia Region of the Milky Way, Harvard University, OCLC 57735549
- Evans, John Wainwright, (1948), A Photometer for Measurement of Sky Brightness Near the Sun, Journal of the Optical Society of America
- Menzel, Donald Howard, Evans, John Wainwright, (1953), The Behavior and Classification of Solar Prominences, Harvard College Observatory, OCLC 123762847
- Evans, John Wainwright, (1963), The Solar Corona, International Astronomical Union, OCLC 53636781
- Altrock, Richard C., Evans, John Wainwright, (1988), Solar and Stellar Coronal Structure and Dynamics, National Solar Observatory, OCLC 702701481
