= Matt Mountain =

President of the Association of Universities for Research in Astronomy

Matt Mountain FRAS
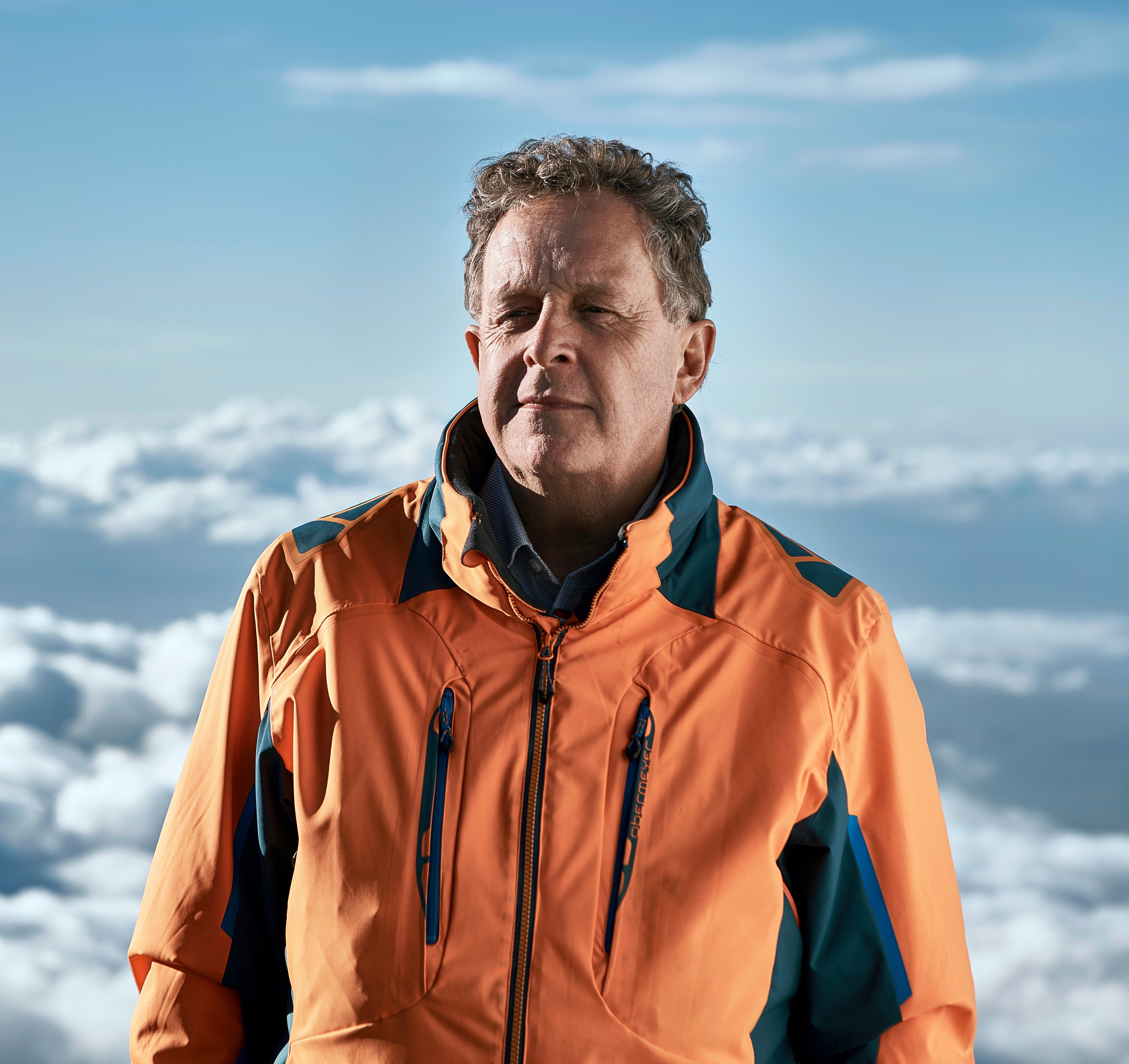
- Born: Charles Mattias Mountain
- Education: Imperial College London (BSc, PhD)
- Awards: Gabriela Mistral Medal (2003)
- Scientific career
- Fields: Astronomy
- Workplaces: Royal Observatory, Edinburgh; Gemini Observatory; Space Telescope Science Institute; AURA
- Thesis: Astronomical Spectrometry In The Near-Infrared (1982)
- Doctoral advisor: M. J. Selby

Charles Mattias ("Matt") Mountain FRAS is currently the President of the Association of Universities for Research in Astronomy (AURA) which designs, builds, and operates telescopes and observatories for the National Science Foundation (NSF) and the National Aeronautics and Space Administration (NASA). AURA's NASA center is the Space Telescope Science Institute (STScI), responsible for the science mission for the Hubble Space Telescope, the science and operations for the James Webb Space Telescope, and the MAST data archive. AURA's NSF centers are Gemini Observatory, the National Optical Astronomy Observatory (NOAO), and the National Solar Observatory (NSO). Dr. Mountain and AURA are also responsible for the NSF construction projects: the Daniel K. Inouye Solar Telescope (DKIST) on Haleakalā, Hawaii and the Large Synoptic Survey Telescope (LSST) on Cerro Pachón in Chile.

AURA is a nonprofit consortium of 46 US Universities and 4 International affiliates formed in 1957 to enable the US Federal Government to provide forefront astronomical facilities to the entire US academic community. Today AURA has both a National and International mission to enable astronomical discovery and promote broad engagement in exploring the Universe. AURA has a staff of over 1,500 scientists, engineers and administrators with an annual operating budget of approximately $350M.

Prior to his position as President of AURA, Mountain served as the Space Telescope Science Institute (STScI) Director in Baltimore, Maryland between September 2005 and March 2015 leading the institute during NASA's last servicing mission to the Hubble Space Telescope (SM4) in 2009, and through the re-formulation of the James Webb Space Telescope project in 2010. While at STScI he used his discretionary Hubble Telescope time for two major science undertakings, the Multi-Cycle Treasury, and the Frontier Fields Programs. Before joining STScI in 2005, Dr. Mountain was the Director of the international Gemini Observatory and led the team that designed, built, and brought into operation the two 8m Gemini telescopes on Mauna Kea, Hawaii, and Cerro Pachón, Chile.

His research interests have included star formation, advanced infrared instrumentation, and the capabilities of advanced telescopes to study exo-planets. Dr. Mountain appeared in several documentaries and TV shows on telescopes and astronomy. He received his degree in Physics in 1979, and Ph.D. in Astrophysics in 1983 both from Imperial College of Science and Technology, University of London. Dr. Mountain has published over 100 research papers, articles, and reports and is a Fellow of the American Association for the Advancement of Science, the International Society for Optical Engineering (SPIE) and the Royal Astronomical Society and a member of the American Astronomical Society (AAS). Dr. Mountain is also the Telescope Scientist for NASA’s James Webb Space Telescope, and Chair of European Observatory's (ESO) Extremely Large Telescope (ELT) Management Advisory Committee.

== Education and career ==
Mountain earned a Bachelor of Science degree in physics in 1978 and a Ph.D. in astronomy in 1983, both from the Imperial College of Science and Technology, London University. After earning his degrees, Mountain held a Science and Engineering Research Council (SERC) fellowship at Imperial College. Mountain later joined the staff of the Royal Observatory in Edinburgh, where he remained for seven years. At the Royal Observatory, Mountain's work involved observations of star formation processes, and he led a team that designed and commissioned the CGS-4 infrared array spectrometer for the United Kingdom Infrared Telescope in Hawaii.

Mountain became project scientist for the Gemini 8-meter telescopes project in 1992, then was appointed director of the seven-nation Gemini project in 1994. Mountain led the team that designed, built, and commissioned the two 8-meter-diameter Gemini telescopes atop Mauna Kea in Hawaii and Cerro Pachón in Chile. The book Giant Telescopes: Astronomical Ambitions and the Promise of Technology details the efforts involved in building the Gemini telescopes. At Gemini's helm for more than a decade, Mountain assumed responsibility for the creation of the Gemini Observatory, which included formulating, implementing, and running the operations and development programs for the two telescopes. Mountain also developed an adaptive optics group to help the Gemini telescopes remain at the forefront of observational infrared astronomy.

In 2002, NASA appointed Mountain to the James Webb Space Telescope (JWST) Science Working Group as the JWST telescope scientist. Mountain worked with the JWST project to downscale the telescope's primary mirror to an achievable diameter. He represented the science community on the Mirror Review Board, contributing to the selection of beryllium mirrors for the telescope. He co-chaired the Science Assessment Team in 2005 and was a member of the Test Assessment Team in 2010. Mountain continues to work with NASA, the JWST project, the JWST instrument teams, and the Science Working Group to ensure that the performance of JWST meets the requirements of the scientific community.

In 2003, Mountain initiated a partnership with the National Optical Astronomy Observatory (NOAO), which resulted in the formation of the New Initiatives Office at the Association of Universities for Research in Astronomy (AURA). The New Initiatives Office conducted a two-year study of the feasibility of ground-based 30-meter telescopes, which led to the inclusion of AURA in the Thirty Meter Telescope (TMT) project. Mountain has also served as a member of the review committee for the California Extremely Large Telescope (which became the TMT) and of the TMT Board.

In 2005, Mountain was appointed the director of the Space Telescope Science Institute (STScI) by AURA in consultation with NASA. As part of his effort to transform STScI into an adaptable multi-mission institution and a modern, diverse workplace, Mountain reorganized STScI's internal management and oversaw the creation of the Science Mission Office, the Project Management Organization, and the Future of the Workplace Committee to advise the director on issues of inclusion and workplace culture.

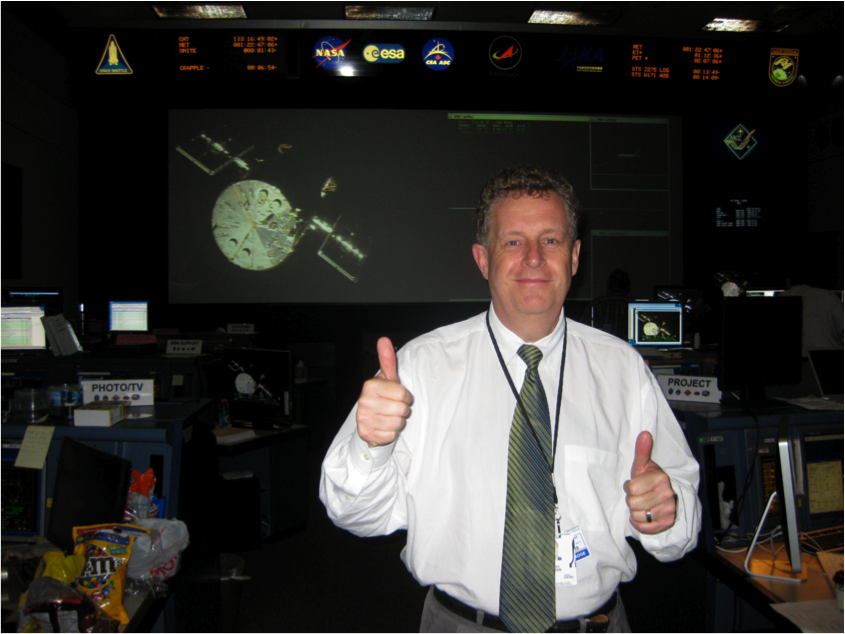
Matt Mountain gives two thumbs up at NASA's Johnson Space Center during Hubble's Servicing Mission 4 in 2009.

As STScI's director, Mountain collaborated with the astronomical community, NASA, and the crew of STS-125 to develop the science priorities for the Hubble Space Telescope's final servicing mission. He also represented the science community at NASA's Johnson Space Center during the mission's extra-vehicular activities in May 2009. After the servicing mission, Mountain initiated Hubble's Multi-Cycle Treasury Programs (in 2010) and the Frontier Fields initiative (in 2013).

As an astrophysicist, Mountain's research interests have included star formation, instrumentation for infrared astronomy, and the capabilities of advanced telescopes. He has published more than 100 research papers, articles, and reports. Mountain is also a professor in the Department of Physics and Astronomy at the Johns Hopkins University and a visiting professor at the University of Oxford. He is a fellow of the American Astronomical Society, the Royal Astronomical Society, and the American Association for the Advancement of Science, and he is a member of the International Society for Optical Engineering (SPIE).

In 2003, Mountain received the Gabriela Mistral Medal for excellence in education from the Chilean Ministry of Education for the Gemini StarTeachers educational program. This was the first time the medal was awarded outside of Chile.
