= Sunspot, New Mexico =

Unincorporated community in New Mexico, United States

- Unincorporated community
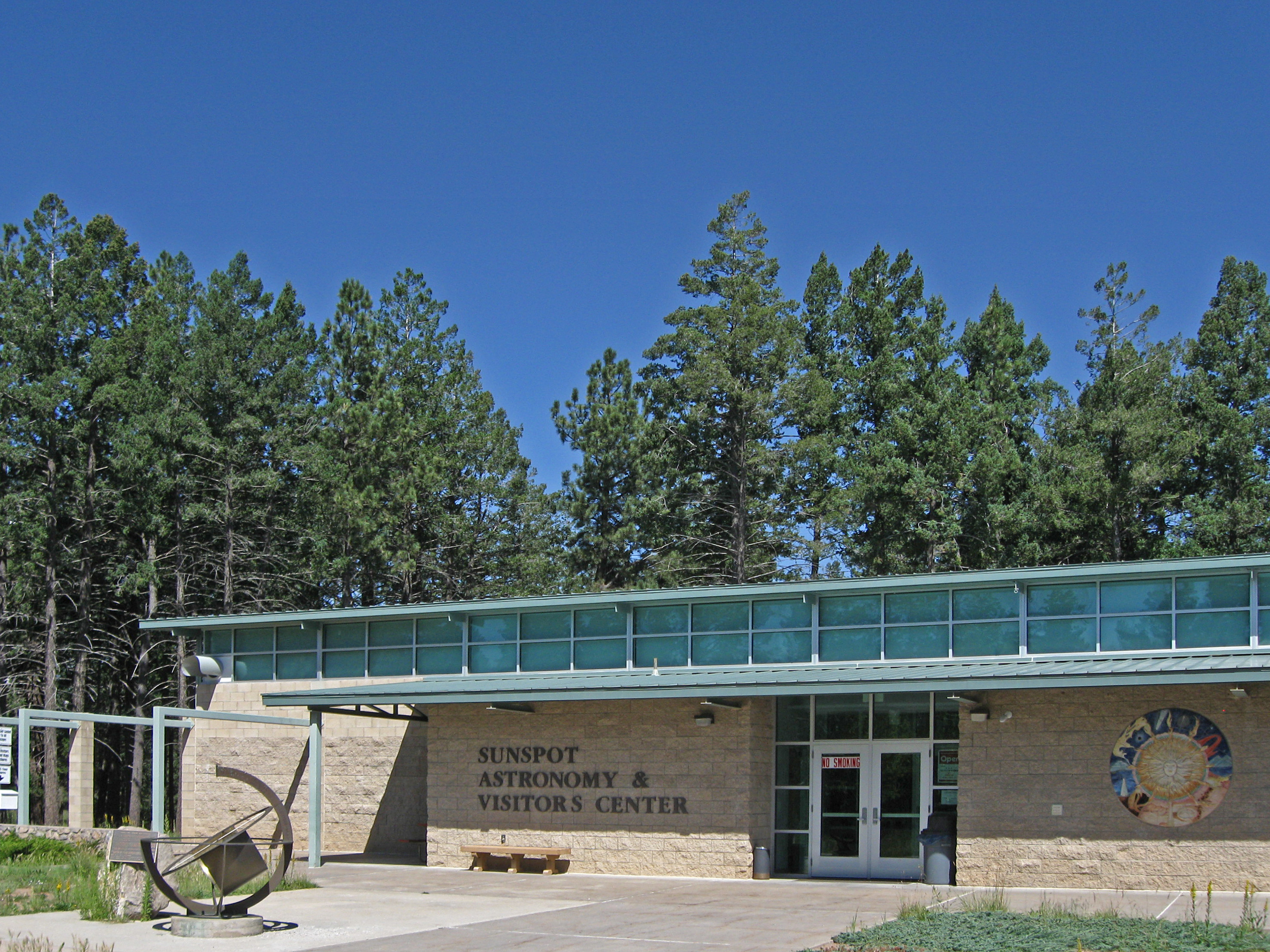
- Sunspot Visitor Center and Museum

- Location within New Mexico
- Coordinates: 32.791°N 105.818°W
- Country: United States
- State: New Mexico
- County: Otero
- Elevation: 9,186 ft (2,800 m)
- Time zone: UTC-7 (Mountain (MST))
  - Summer (DST): UTC-6 (MDT)
- Zip code: 88349
- Area code: 575
- GNIS feature ID: 936625

Sunspot is an unincorporated community in the Sacramento Mountains in the Lincoln National Forest in Otero County, New Mexico, United States, about 18 miles (29 km) south of Cloudcroft. Its elevation is 9,186 feet (2,800 m). The Sunspot Solar Observatory and Apache Point Observatory are located in Sunspot in the Sacramento Mountains. The site of Sunspot is leased by the National Science Foundation (NSF) from the US Forest Service (USFS), and is operated and maintained by the Association of Universities for Research in Astronomy. The telescope and site are both open to the public, and the visitors center offers guided tours of the site on Saturdays and Sundays. On other days there is a self-guided 1/2 mile trail around the telescope and White Sands overlook.

== History ==
Sunspot is an unincorporated community located the Lincoln National Forest which has a diverse range of native flora and fauna including more than 200 species of birds, as well as mule deer.

It was named after the presence of the National Solar Observatory on Sacramento Peak, in a vote that was allegedly rigged by the observatory's director John Evans. The road leading to Sunspot from Cloudcroft is New Mexico State Road 6563, named for the brightest wavelength of hydrogen emission, H-alpha. This scenic byway features signposts marking the relative locations of the planets from the sun in proportion to their distance to Sunspot.

== Temporary closure and conspiracies ==
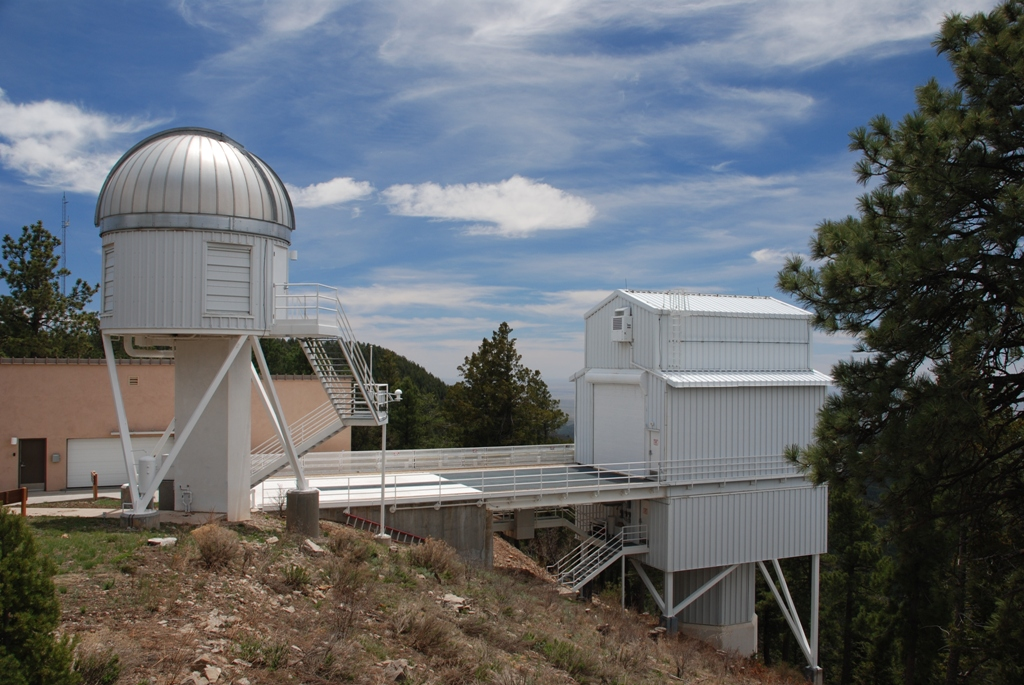
Apache Point Observatory, 2010

On September 6, 2018, AURA voluntarily evacuated the site of Sunspot for security reasons. This prompted the formation of multiple conspiracy theories, including presence of aliens, military intelligence operations, impending solar storms, and FBI raids. These all originated from false information provided by the local sheriff.

A local TV station provided a call-in from a supposed employee with a disguised voice, although this was later found to be faked by the reporter. On September 17 AURA re-opened Sunspot, following an investigation into criminal activity involving Apache Point Observatory personnel. Later, court documents reported that the closure was due to threats from the Apache Point Observatory janitor who was subsequently the center of a federal investigation. During the course of the investigation, AURA had decided to evacuate the site and terminated the contract that had been held by the janitor. Apache Point Observatory had not been closed despite the ongoing presence of the suspect at that location during the investigation. The suspect was known by a few others who had been previously removed from Sunspot, or fired. Once the threat was no longer present, Sunspot was reopened by AURA.

== Future ==
On September 24, 2018 Wired magazine published an article on the observatory. It stated that "Assuming New Mexico State gets a contract that goes till 2021, the site’s ultimate future may still be in flux. The National Science Foundation presented four potential ending options, and their impacts, earlier this year." Of these 4, NSF determined to keep Sunspot in operation in partnership with New Mexico State University.

== Education ==
It is zoned to Cloudcroft Municipal Schools.

== See also ==
- Sunspot Solar Observatory
- National Solar Observatory
- Apache Point Observatory
