= Yuan-Sen Ting =

Malaysian astrophysicist and AI researcher

- Citizenship: Malaysian
- Alma mater: National University of Singapore (M.Sc. 2012; B.Sc. 2011); École Polytechnique (M.S.E. 2012); Harvard University (Ph.D. 2017; M.A. 2014)
- Scientific career
- Fields: Astrophysics
- Workplaces: The Ohio State University; Australian National University; Institute for Advanced Study

Yuan-Sen Ting is a Malaysian astrophysicist and AI researcher who specializes in using artificial intelligence, machine learning, and statistical methods to understand the universe. He is an Associate Professor of Astronomy at The Ohio State University, where he is a faculty member of the Center for Cosmology and Astroparticle Physics (CCAPP).

== Career ==
In 2017, after earning his Ph.D. in Astrophysics and Astronomy from Harvard University, Ting joined the School of Natural Sciences at the Institute for Advanced Study as a Member and subsequently became a NASA Hubble Fellow. In 2021, Ting joined the Australian National University, where he held a joint appointment in the Research School of Astronomy and Astrophysics and the Research School of Computer Science. He was promoted to Associate Professor in 2022.

Since 2024, Ting has held the position of Associate Professor in the Department of Astronomy at The Ohio State University.

== Selected awards ==
- 2019: AURA Future Leader, The Association of Universities for Research in Astronomy
- 2018: NASA Hubble Fellowship
- 2017: Carnegie-Princeton Fellowship

== Selected publications ==
- Liu, Fan; Ting, Yuan-Sen; Yong, David; et al. (2024). "At least one in a dozen stars shows evidence of planetary ingestion". Nature. 627 (8004). doi:10.1038/s41586-024-07091-y. ISSN 1476-4687
- Ting, Yuan-Sen (2024). "Why Machine Learning Models Systematically Underestimate Extreme Values". The Open Journal of Astrophysics. 8. doi:10.33232/001c.142224. ISSN 2565-6120.
- Ting, Yuan-Sen; Weinberg, David H. (2022-03). "How Many Elements Matter?". The Astrophysical Journal. 927 (2). The American Astronomical Society: 209. doi:10.3847/1538-4357/ac5023. ISSN 0004-637X
