= Synoptic Optical Long-term Investigations of the Sun =

Set of Sun-observing instruments

Synoptic Optical Long-term Investigations of the Sun (SOLIS)
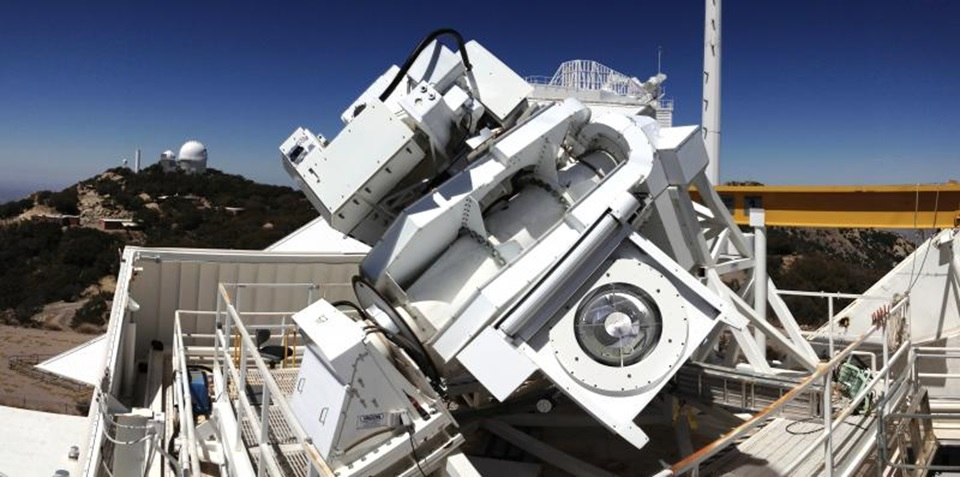
- SOLIS instruments at the National Solar Observatory (NSO) at Kitt Peak
- Location: Big Bear Solar Observatory, California
- Coordinates: 34.260547°N 116.920920°W
- Organization: NSO Integrated Synoptic Program (NISP)
- Altitude: 2063.1 m
- Built: 2003
- Website: solis.nso.edu
- Related media on Commons

Synoptic Optical Long-term Investigations of the Sun (SOLIS) is a synoptic facility for solar observations over a long time frame that is funded by the National Science Foundation (NSF) and designed and built by the National Solar Observatory (NSO). It is operated by the NSO Integrated Synoptic Program (NISP). SOLIS is a single set of three instruments mounted on a common observing platform. The instruments are the 50 cm aperture Vector Spectromagnetograph (VSM), the 8 mm aperture Integrated Sunlight Spectrometer (ISS), and the 14 cm aperture Full-Disk Patrol (FDP). The VSM telescope is a quasi-Ritchey-Chretien design with a primary mirror operating at f/1.6. The ~ 400 W of solar light from the primary is reflected by a secondary mirror fabricated from a single silicon crystal. The final f/6.6 full-disk solar image is focused on a spectrograph slit that is cooled by a flow of chilled water-propylene glycol solution. The mirrors are coated with protected silver. To improve the internal seeing, the VSM is sealed by 74 cm diameter, 6 mm thick fused silica window. Originally, it was filled with helium at about ambient pressure and temperature. In 2014, helium was replaced by nitrogen due to the increasing cost of helium. Due to this change, the image sharpness was slightly degraded.

The VSM provides full-disk vector (strength and direction) maps of the solar magnetic field both in the photosphere and in the chromosphere on a daily basis, continuing the 40-year record of NSO magnetic field observations. The ISS obtains spectra of the Sun integrated over the solar disk, so the Sun appears as it would as a much more distant star. The combination of data from the ISS and the VSM is useful for studies of exoplanet systems as it allows the modeling of the influence of a star's magnetic field on its spectrum giving clues to the activity level that the exoplanets may be subject to. The FDP provides full-disk images of the Sun in a variety of spectral lines with a cadence as high as 10 seconds.

SOLIS was located on top of the Vacuum Telescope building at Kitt Peak National Observatory until July 2014, then temporarily moved to the University of Arizona Agricultural Farm in Tucson until October 2017, and is now being permanently relocated to Big Bear Solar Observatory in California. Construction of the new SOLIS facility began in April of 2021, and was mostly completed by the end of that year. In December of 2021, the primary telescope mount was installed inside the newly constructed building. In September of 2024, the VSM and FDP were successfully installed on the main telescope mount. Once back to operations, SOLIS will provide unique observations of the Sun on a continuing basis for several decades to understand the solar activity cycle, sudden energy releases in the solar atmosphere, and solar irradiance changes and their relationship to global change.

== SOLIS Gallery ==
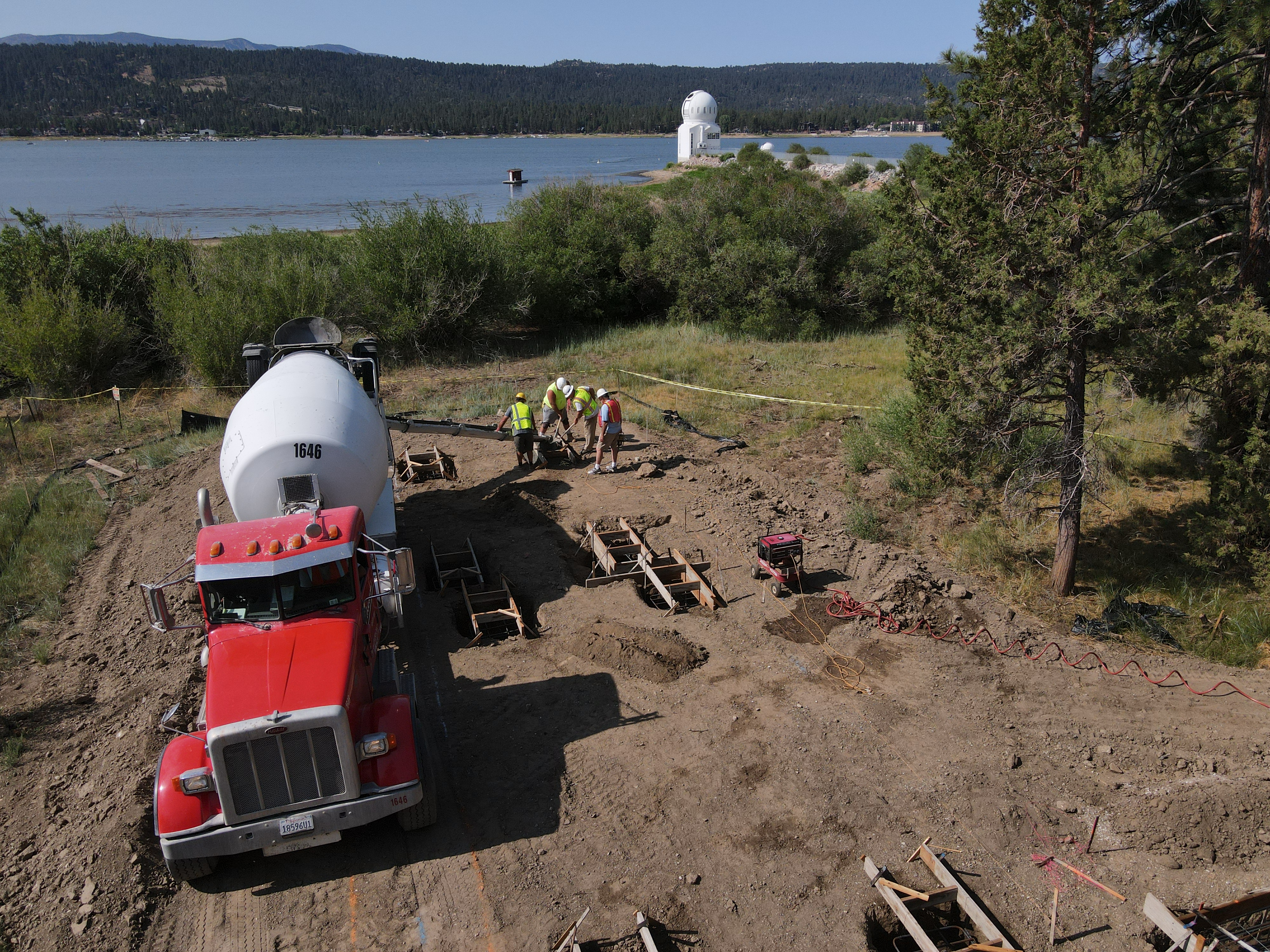
Crews pour concrete footings, the first step in the construction of a permanent home of the NSF’s SOLIS instrument at Big Bear Solar Observatory in California

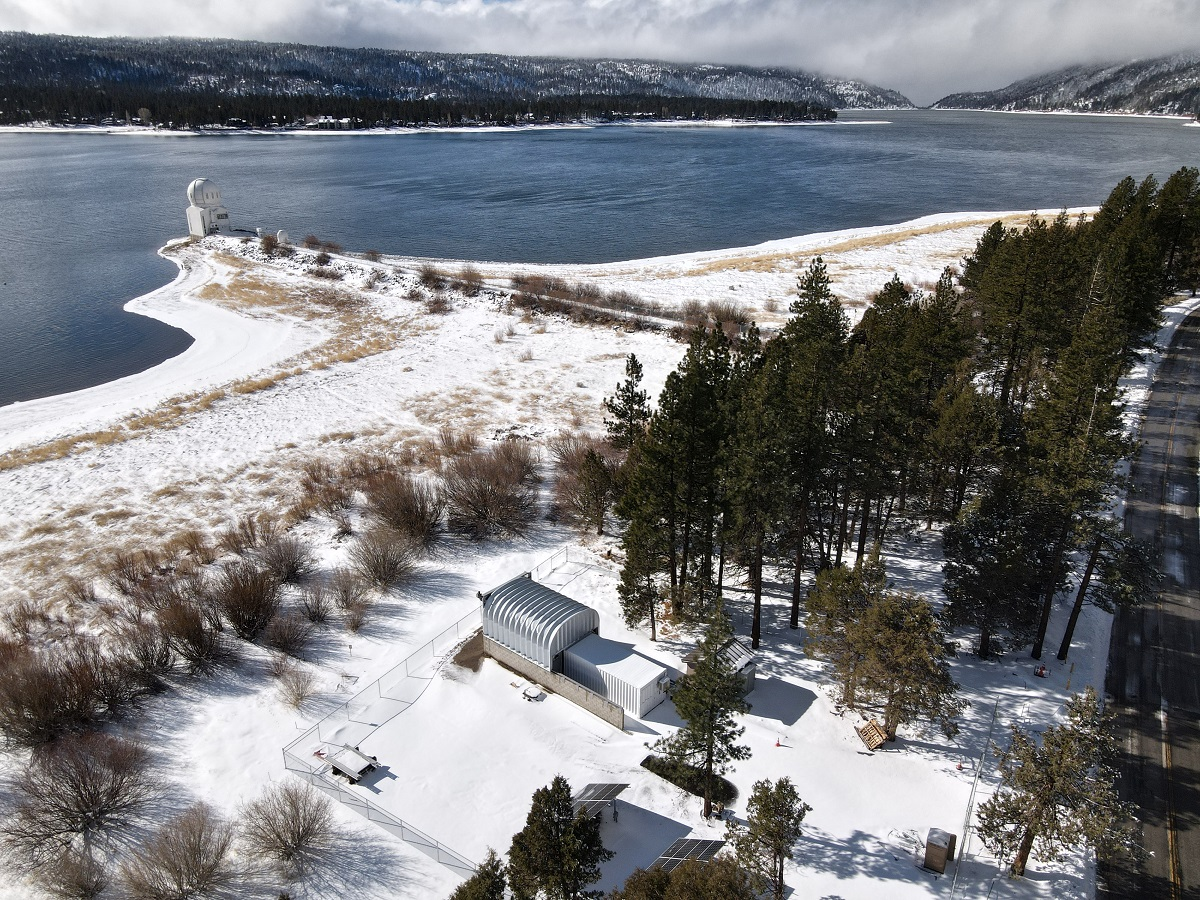
SOLIS on the shore of Big Bear Lake, California. White dome in the background is the Goode Solar Telescope

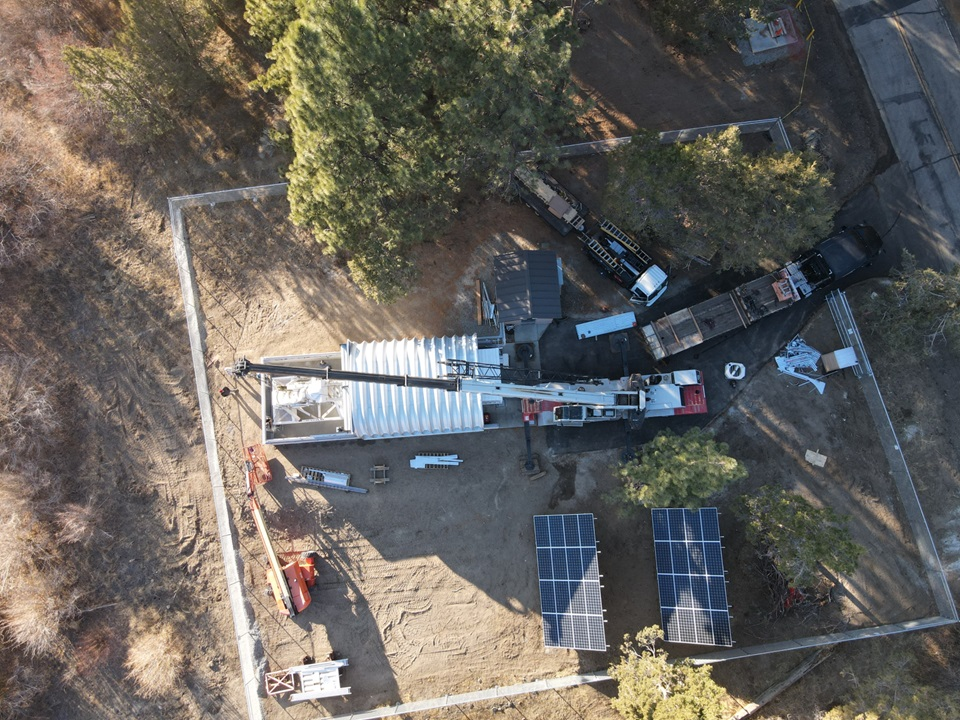
SOLIS mount installation looking down

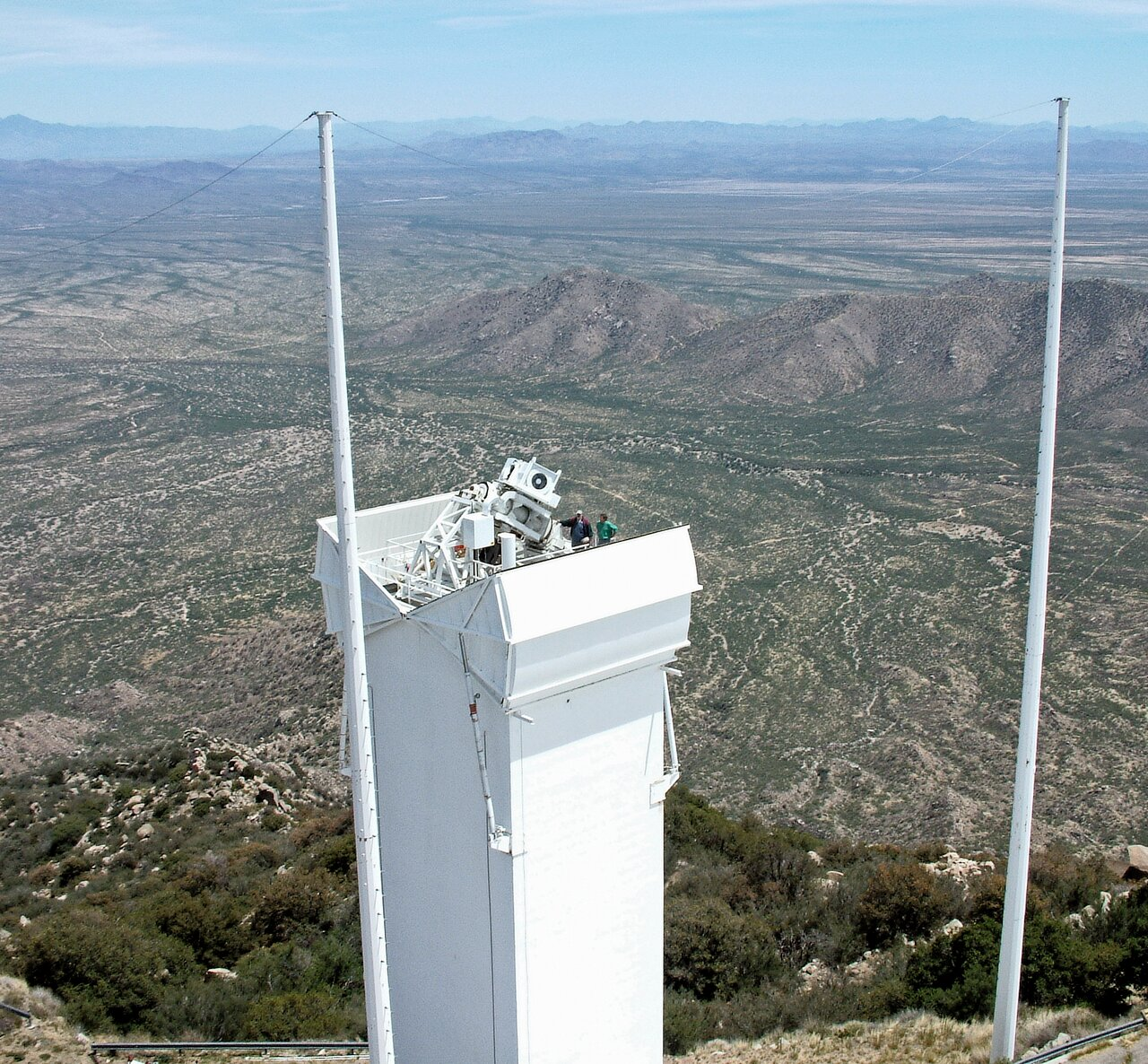
The vector spectromagnetograph mounted on top of the Kitt Peak Synoptic Optical Long-term Investigations of the Sun (SOLIS) Tower, formerly the vacuum telescope tower.

== See also ==
- List of astronomical observatories
