= Sunspot Solar Observatory =

Astronomical observatory

- Sacramento Peak
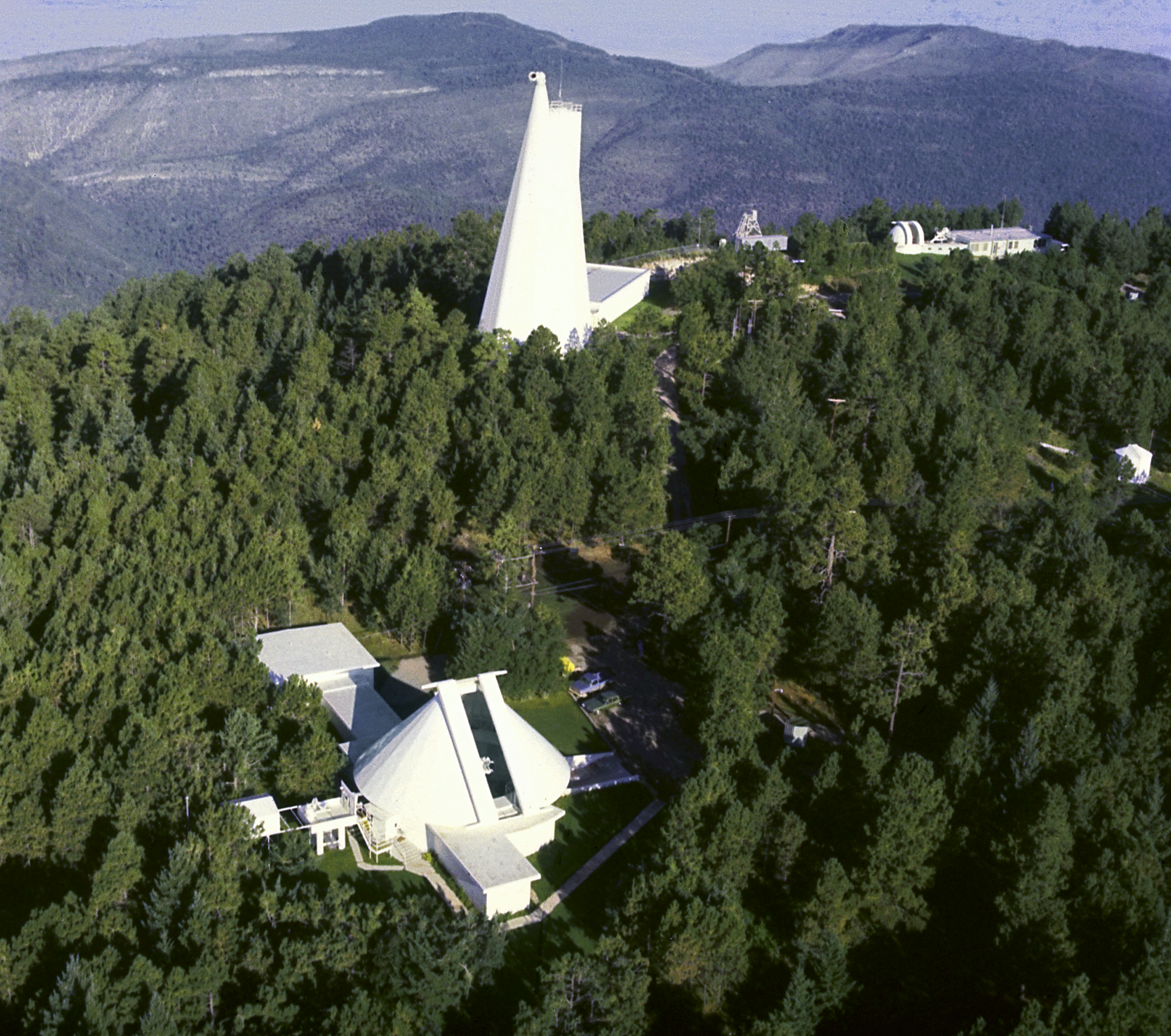
- Telescopes and other buildings at the Sunspot Solar Observatory
- Established: 1947
- Research type: basic
- Field of research: Solar Physics, Space Weather
- Staff: 12
- Location: Highway 6563, Sunspot, NM, 88349, USA, Sunspot, New Mexico, 88349, USA; 32.7882°N 105.8195°W
- Affiliations: New Mexico State University
- Operating agency: AURA, NSF
- Website: www.sunspot.solar

The Sunspot Solar Observatory (SSO), also known as the Sacramento Peak Observatory, is an astronomical observatory designed for the study of the Sun. In February 2026, the U.S. National Science Foundation announced that the Sunspot Solar Observatory closed to the public indefinitely following the discovery of a mercury leak in the Dunn Solar Telescope.

== General information ==
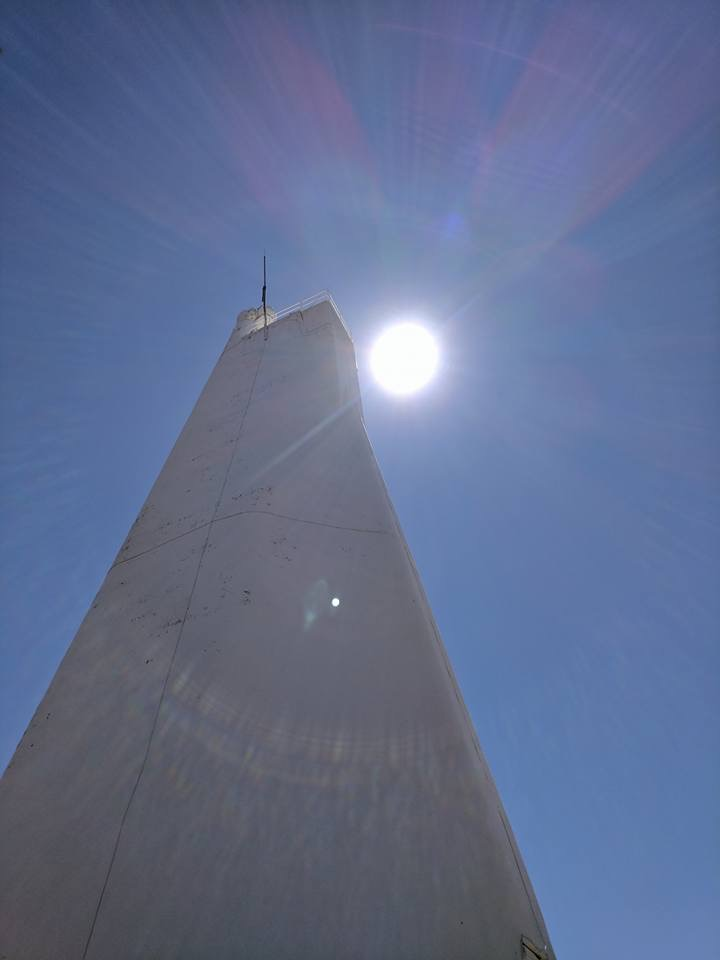
The tower of the DST. Taken from the ground looking up at the Sun.

The Sunspot telescope facility is located in Sunspot, New Mexico, and is part of the Lincoln National Forest on the western edge of the Sacramento Mountains. The ~250-acre (100 ha) area is located on National Forest Service lands, managed by the U.S. Department of Agriculture, U.S. Forest Service (USFS), Lincoln National Forest, and the Sacramento Ranger District. Established by the U.S. Air Force (USAF) via a Memorandum of Agreement with the USFS in 1950, the facility was transferred to NSF in 1976. NSF and the USFS executed a land use agreement (1980) to formalize this transfer and the continued use of the land for the NSO. It was later known as the Sacramento Peak Observatory, and as one site of the National Solar Observatory (NSO). In 2018, all scientific research and public outreach at the telescope facility was taken over by the Sunspot Solar Observatory and AURA remain the operator of infrastructure on the site, including maintenance.

Sunspot Solar Observatory is a global consortium that currently consists of personnel both in Sunspot, New Mexico, at New Mexico State University in Las Cruces, New Mexico, and other institutes across the world.

In February 2026, the U.S. National Science Foundation announced that the Sunspot Solar Observatory would remain closed to the public indefinitely following the discovery of a mercury leak in the Dunn Solar Telescope.

== Telescopes ==
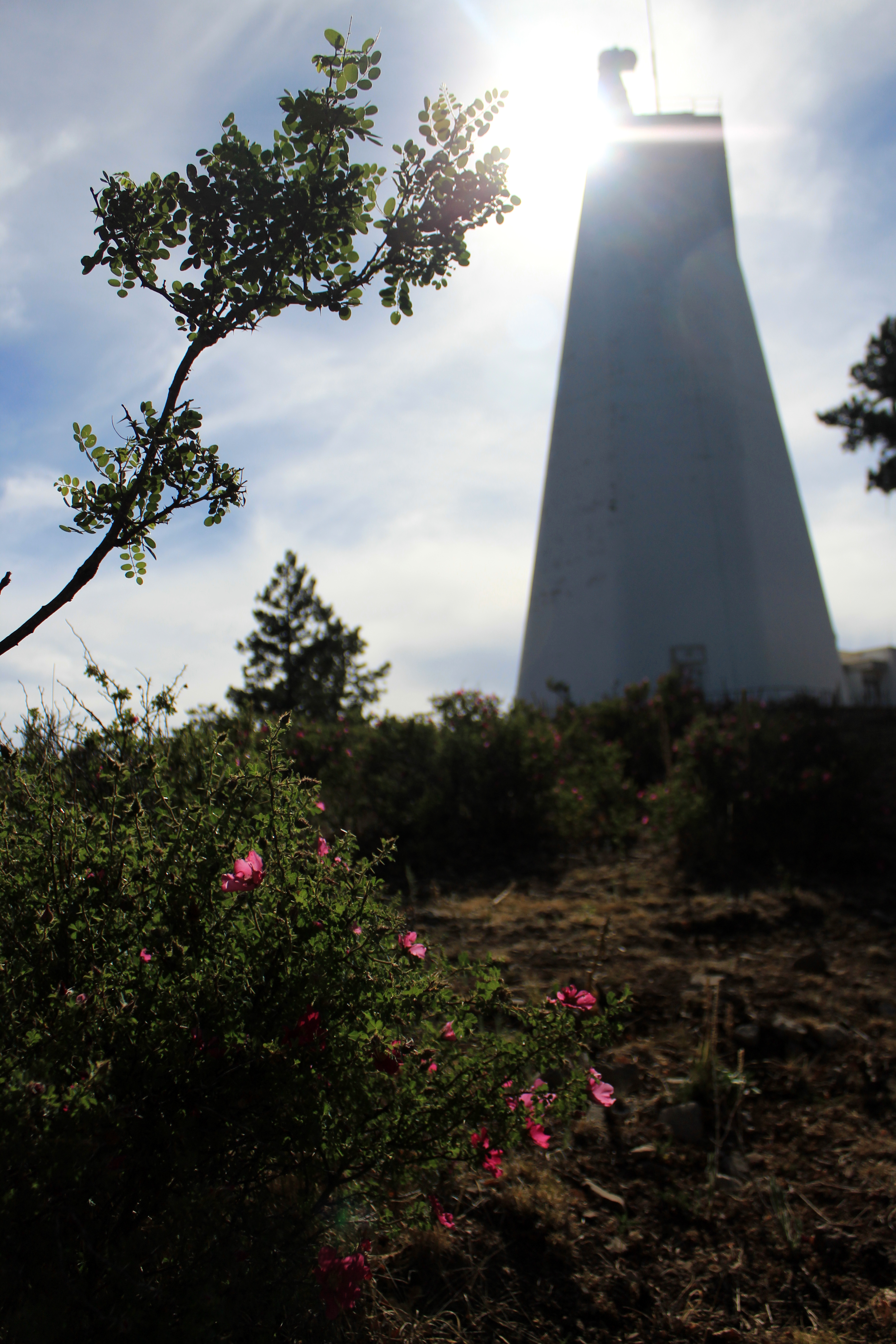
Mountain top DST image

The flagship telescope at the Sacramento Peak Observatory is the Richard B. Dunn Solar Telescope (DST), previously known as the Vacuum Tower Telescope. In February 2026, the U.S. National Science Foundation announced that the Dunn Solar Telescope would be rendered inoperable following the discovery of liquid mercury inside the instrument’s main bearing system. NSF determined that the most prudent course of action was to drain and remove the mercury for safety and environmental reasons, a process that will permanently end DST operations and precede demolition and site restoration.

In addition to the DST, Sunspot Solar Observatory hosts four other telescopes.

The John W. Evans Solar Facility (originally built 1952) hosted instruments for the High Altitude Observatory and the Air Force Research Lab and until 2009 obtained daily observations of million degree coronal emission that were used to predict the onset of the following solar cycle.

The other two Dome buildings (Hilltop Dome 1963, Grain Bin Dome 1950) are not used for research.

An Antarctic Mount telescope is situated beside the Visitors' Center on site and provides a light feed into the Visitors' Center. As the name suggests, this telescope was previously deployed in the Antarctic.

== Visitor Center ==
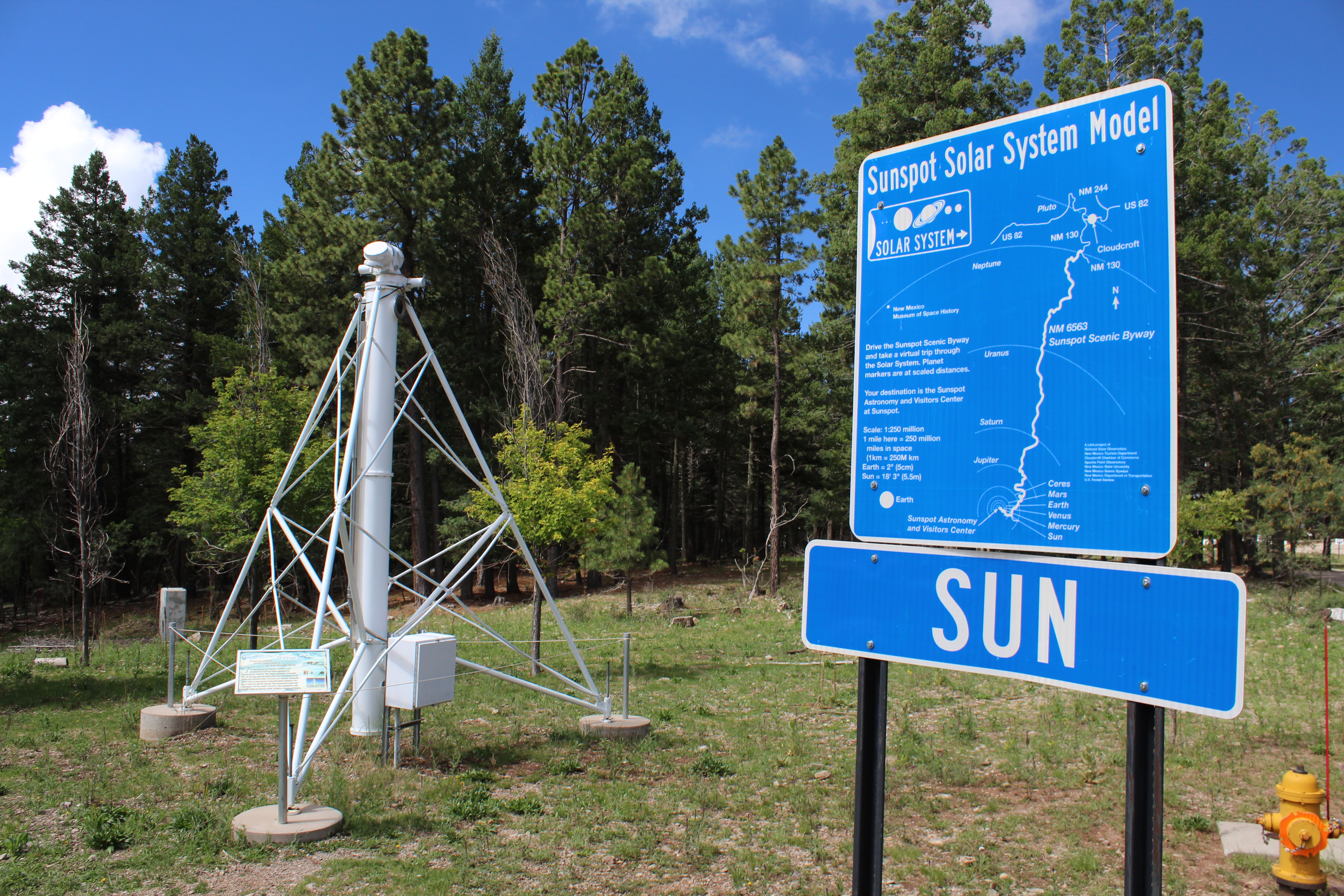
The scale model finish at the Sun, on highway 6563, New Mexico

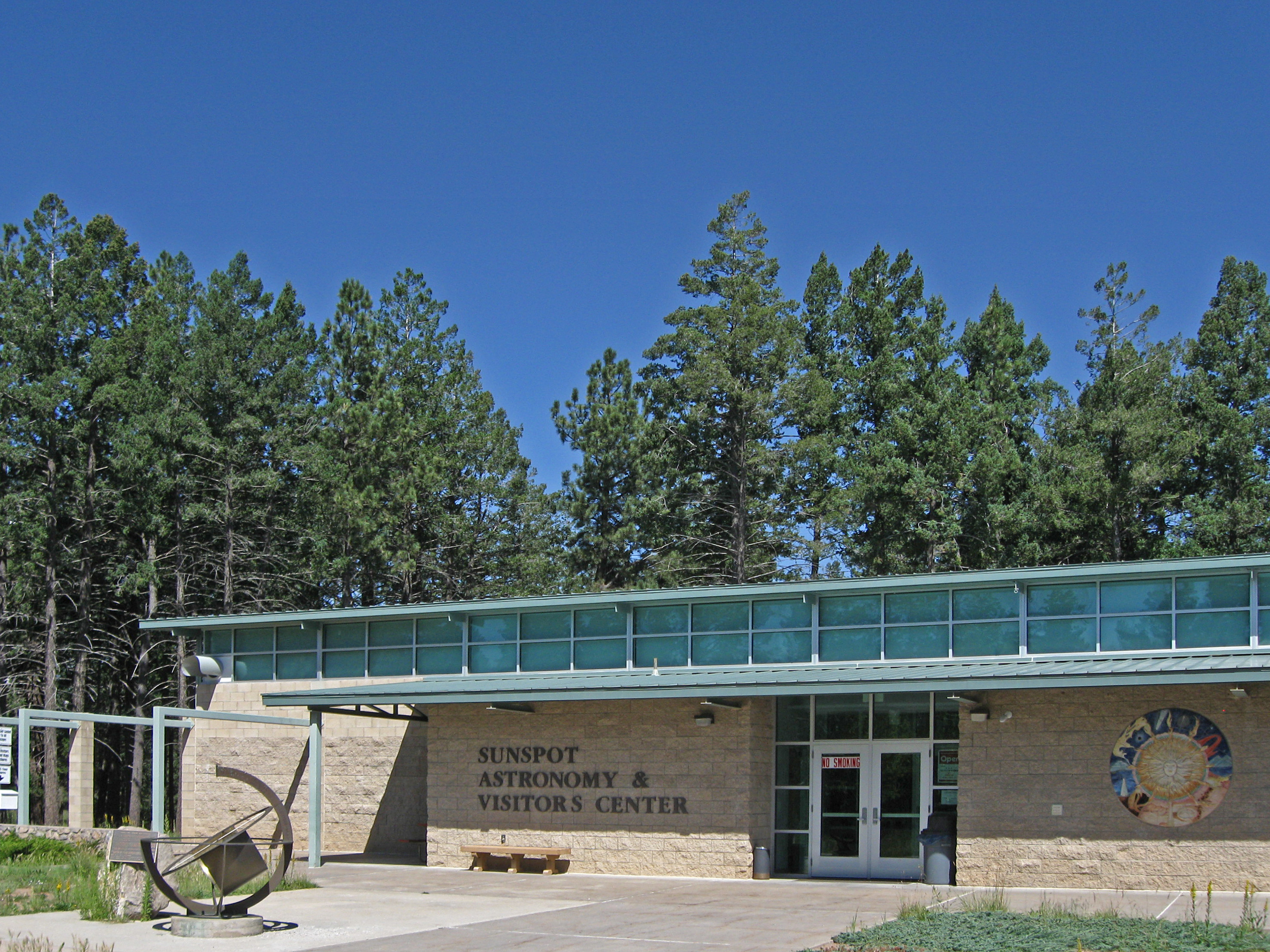
Sunspot Astronomy and Visitors' Center

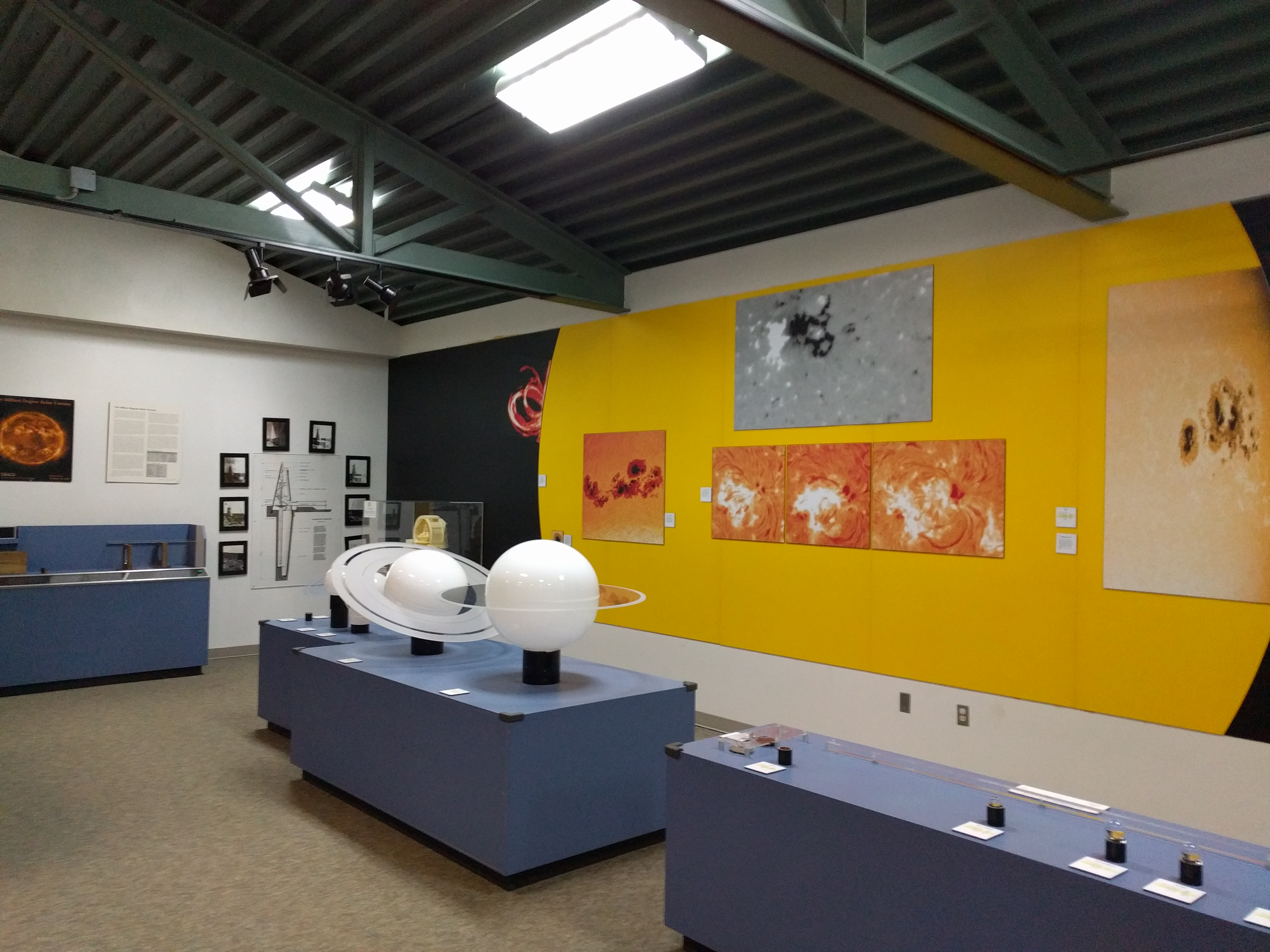
Inside the visitors' center

The Sunspot Visitor Center is closed to the public as noted elsewhere. The Sunspot Astronomy and Visitor Center provided an interactive astronomical experience through activities, displays, and informational exhibits. The Center was operated by New Mexico State University through support from the state of New Mexico and provided guided tours of the site and the telescope for the public on Saturday and Sunday. Self-guided tours were available during other times. The Visitor Center contained exhibits from the Dunn Solar Telescope, the Apache Point Observatory, and the Lincoln National Forest.

== History ==
The origins of Sunspot as a Solar Observatory date back to the sudden increased interest of solar physics to the US military during the Second World War. In 1940, the High Altitude Observatory (HAO) was established in 1940 in Climax, Colorado, by Walter Orr Roberts and Donald Menzel. It was associated with both Harvard College Observatory and the University of Colorado and was incorporated in 1946. At the time it was the world's highest permanent observatory for astronomy, at an elevation of over 11,000 feet, and was designed purely for studying the Sun. Roberts worked with the Bureau of Standards, "forecasting radio conditions on the basis of solar observations". Such studies of the upper atmosphere were critical for predicting conditions for radio communication, guided missiles, and supersonic aircraft and, as a result, solar observations "became essential to the war effort". Suddenly the field of solar astronomy became an appealing goal for both astronomers and the military.

The Sacramento Peak Observatory was conceived as a complementary telescope to the existing facilities in Climax, as Roberts had realized that "there were long periods of cloudiness, especially during the winter, when it was not possible to make observations", and hence a second dedicated solar observatory should be established. The practical applications for solar research, as discovered by the military during World War II, regarding the impact solar activity had on radio communication spurred the US Congress to provide for a military-funded observatory. It became an important mission of the USAF to establish a solar observatory and "after the war, when the Air Force recognized the need to organize its own long-range program of solar studies, it quite naturally turned for specialized assistance to the recently formed High Altitude Observatory (HAO)". In September 1947, the USAF issued a contract to HAO and Harvard University to conduct a survey and thereby identify an appropriate site for a new solar observatory and to determine which instruments to install at the new site.

Any seasonal cloud cover at the new site needed to arrive in the opposite season to that at Climax, in order to then provide for year-round coverage of the Sun. Similar to Climax, the atmosphere above the new site should be exceptionally free from haze and dust in order to permit for the best possible observing. Roberts and Menzel examined the White Sands Proving Ground (an area used as a research rocket firing range near Holloman Air Force Base in Alamogordo, New Mexico). They "concluded that the section of the Sacramento Mountains in which Sacramento Peak is located would be especially promising for a solar research site. Further inquiries and inspection tended to confirm this initial reaction". Holloman Air Force Base could be used to supply the equipment and any supplies. Sacramento Peak was, at 9200 feet was also low enough to be more accessible to researchers than Climax at 11,000 feet and the thickly forested setting blocked interference from rising air currents up the mountain.

A small crew of five made the initial camp at the Sunspot site. This crew included Roberts, John "Jack" W. Evans (a student of Menzel's), and Rudy Cook (who had worked with Robert in Climax). Cook's companions soon returned home, leaving Cook and his dog Rocky to man the site. By the end of 1947, Menzel and Roberts made the recommendation that Sacramento Peak be chosen as the solar research site for USAF. By April 1948, the Committee on Geophysical Sciences (then within the War Department's Research and Development Board) formally accepted this recommendation and a contract was written, mandating the Air Force to complete the observatory. The specifics of the contract called for "the preparation of detailed plans for an integrated solar research facility, which would combine observational, analytical, and data-reduction activities, all on a larger scale than at any comparable observatory; design, development, and fabrication of the required optical device; and concurrently, theoretical studies of solar structure and characteristics"

== Views from Sunspot ==
On the western side of the Sacramento peak, there are wide open views of Apache Point Observatory and Sloan Digital Sky Survey telescopes. From the overlook beside the telescope, White Sands National Park stands out as gypsum white against the sandy background of the desert. On a clear day it is possible to see all the way south to the cities of El Paso, Texas, and Ciudad Juárez, Mexico, and all the way north to the Trinity test site. The overlook can also be used for viewing rocket launches from White Sands Missile Range.

== Gallery ==
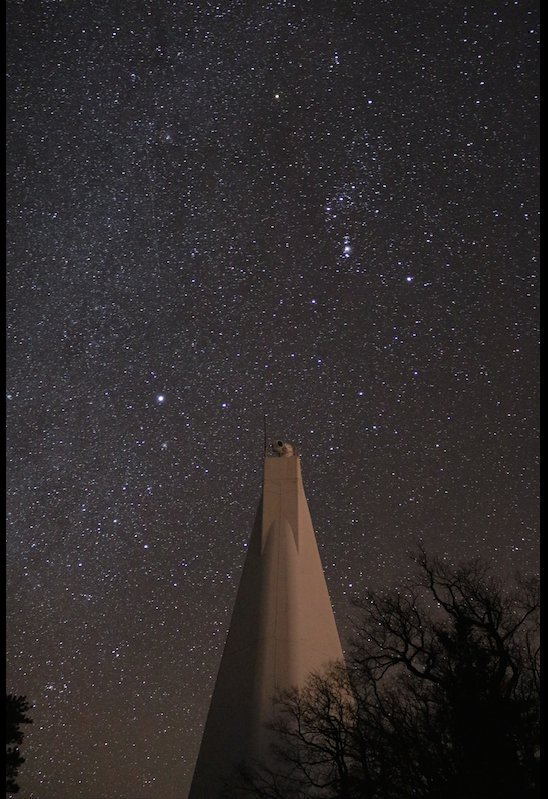
DST at night

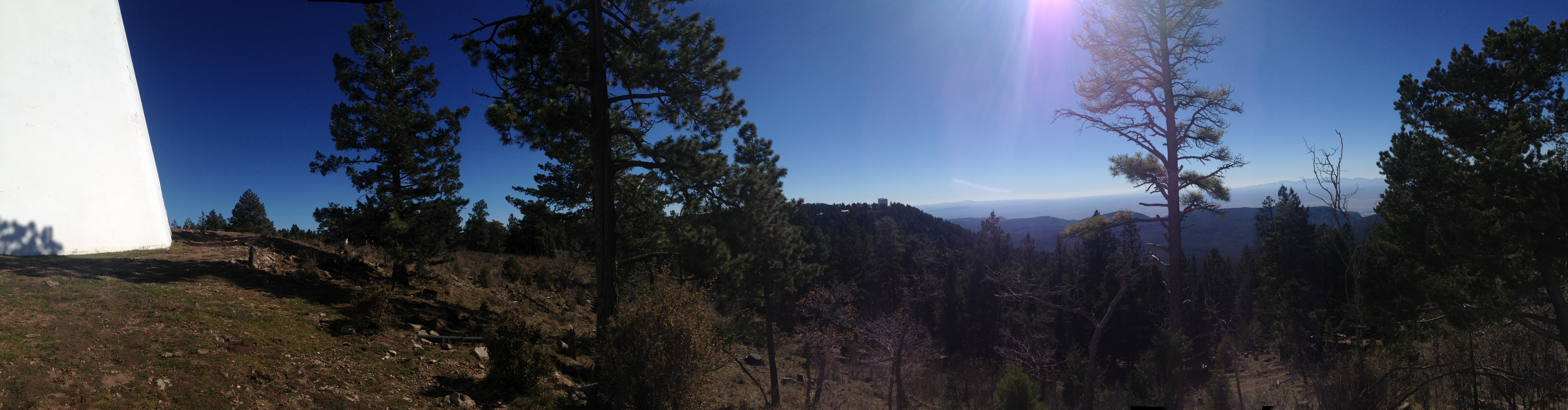
SDSS from Sunspot

== See also ==
- List of astronomical observatories
- List of solar telescopes
