= Apache Point Observatory =

Observatory in New Mexico, US

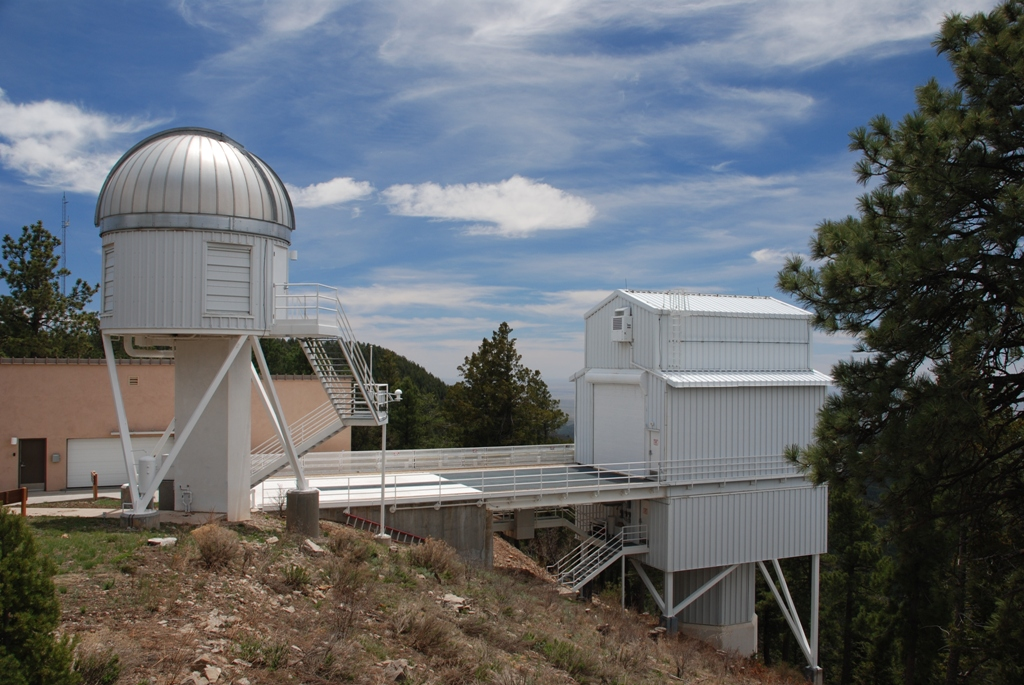
- ARCSAT and SDSS telescope buildings at the Apache Point Observatory.
- Alternative names: APO
- Organization: Astrophysical Research Consortium
- Observatory code: 705, 645
- Location: Sunspot, New Mexico
- Coordinates: 32°46′49″N 105°49′13″W
- Altitude: 2,788 meters (9,147 ft)
- Weather: 65% clear nights
- Established: 1985
- Website: www.apo.nmsu.edu

Telescopes
- Astrophysical Research Consortium telescope: 3.5 m reflector
- Sloan Digital Sky Survey telescope: 2.5 m reflector
- New Mexico State University telescope: 1.0 m reflector
- ARCSAT: 0.5 m reflector
- Related media on Commons

The Apache Point Observatory (APO; obs. code: 705) is an astronomical observatory located in the Sacramento Mountains in Sunspot, New Mexico, United States, approximately 18 miles (29 km) south of Cloudcroft. The observatory is operated by New Mexico State University (NMSU) and owned by the Astrophysical Research Consortium (ARC). Access to the telescopes and buildings is private and restricted.

== History ==
The ARC was formed in 1984 with the goal of building the 3.5 m telescope. It originally consisted of five institutions: New Mexico State University, University of Washington, University of Chicago, Princeton University, and Washington State University, some of which have since withdrawn.

Several additional organizations have joined over time: Johns Hopkins University, University of Colorado, University of Virginia, Georgia State University, University of Oklahoma, University of Wyoming, and Brigham Young University. Funding for the 3.5 m and 0.5 m telescopes comes from the consortium members, but funds for the 2.5 m telescope come from a much wider array of sources. The 1.0 m telescope is supported exclusively by NMSU.

== Telescopes ==
=== ARC 3.5 m ===
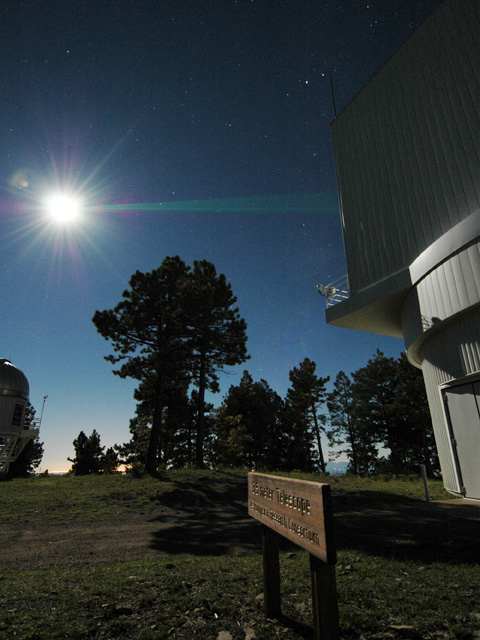
The ARC 3.5-meter telescope

The ARC 3.5 m (140 in) telescope is a Ritchey-Chretien reflector on an alt-azimuth mount with instruments attached at several focal points. Construction of the building began in 1985, but full operations of the telescope were delayed until November 1994 due to problems with fabricating the primary mirror. From 1991 until early 1993, the telescope was fitted with a 1.8 m mirror, now located at Rothney Astrophysical Observatory under a cost-sharing agreement.

There are a variety of optical and near-infrared instruments available for the 3.5 m telescope, including:

- The ARC echelle spectrometer (ARCES) uses a 2048 × 2048 pixel CCD and has a resolution of $R\sim 31{,}500$.
- The Double Imaging Spectrometer (DIS) is a low-resolution optical spectrometer.
- KOSMOS, on long-term loan from NOIRLab, is a low-resolution optical spectrometer.
- The Near Infrared Camera/Fabry–Pérot Spectrometer (NICFPS) was developed at the University of Colorado. It uses a 1024 × 1024 H1RG HgCdTe infrared detector and a near-infrared Fabry–Pérot interferometer. It has many narrow band filters, including H2, [Fe II], and [SiVI]. It is unique among astronomical Fabry-Pérot devices in that it is cooled with liquid nitrogen.
- The Astrophysical Research Consortium Telescope Imaging Camera (ARCTIC) is an optical imaging instrument with a 4096 × 4096 pixel CCD.
- TripleSpec (Tspec) is a near infrared spectrograph which provides continuous wavelength coverage over the range 0.94–2.46 μm at moderate resolution ($R\sim 3500$, depending on the choice of slit).
- Agile is a high-speed imager with a 1024 × 1024 frame transfer CCD.

The 3.5 m telescope is also used by the Apache Point Observatory Lunar Laser-ranging Operation (APOLLO) lunar-ranging project. The APOLLO laser has been operational since October 2005, and routinely accomplishes millimeter-level range accuracy between the Earth and the Moon.

Observations using the 3.5 m telescope can be carried out remotely by observers using TUI, the Telescope User Interface, via the internet.

=== SDSS 2.5 m ===
SDSS 2.5m Telescope

The SDSS 2.5 m (98 in) telescope is used for the Sloan Digital Sky Survey, and began operating in 2000. It is a Ritchey-Chretien reflector on an alt-azimuth mount housed under a roll-off enclosure. It was designed with an unusually large 3° field of view to better support its primary task of surveying the entire sky.

=== NMSU 1.0 m ===
The NMSU 1.0 m (39 in) telescope is a Ritchey-Chretien reflector set on an alt-azimuth mount, and was completed in 1994. A 2048 × 2048 CCD mounted at the Nasmyth focus provides at 15.7-arcminute view of the sky.

=== 0.5 m ARCSAT ===
The ARC Small Aperture Telescope (ARCSAT) was previously called the Photometric Telescope (PT) when it was part of the SDSS project. It is a 0.5 m (20 in) reflecting telescope on an equatorial mount, with a single CCD camera cooled by a CryoTiger unit. It was built in 1991, moved from its previous location in 1998, and used by the SDSS until 2005. It is currently used for small research projects.

=== Former telescopes ===
- A 0.6 m (24 in) reflecting telescope was built in 1993 to monitor sky conditions for the SDSS project. It never operated in a satisfactory manner, and was replaced with the 0.5 m PT.

== List of discovered minor planets ==
The Minor Planet Center credits the discovery of the following minor planets directly to the Apache Point Observatory:

(227119) 2005 ND_{85}	3 July 2005	list
(245170) 2004 TE_{116}	4 October 2004	list
(254369) 2004 TD_{116}	4 October 2004	list
(268095) 2004 RJ_{257}	9 September 2004	list
(271691) 2004 RW_{106}	9 September 2004	list

(271801) 2004 TD_{78}	4 October 2004	list
(283979) 2004 RN_{170}	8 September 2004	list
(399680) 2004 TP_{21}	4 October 2004	list
(427855) 2005 NN_{67}	3 July 2005	list

== See also ==
- List of astronomical observatories
- List of largest optical reflecting telescopes
- List of minor planet discoverers § Discovering dedicated institutions
- Sunspot Solar Observatory
