= Cathey Peak =

Mountain in New Mexico, United States

- Location within New Mexico

Highest point
- Elevation: 9,645 ft (2,940 m)
- Coordinates: 32°48′27″N 105°47′59″W

Geography
- Location: Otero County, New Mexico, U.S.
- Parent range: Sacramento Mountains
- Topo map: USGS Sacramento Peak

Climbing
- Easiest route: Road

Cathey Peak is a peak in the Sacramento Mountains, in the south-central part of the U.S. State of New Mexico. It lies in Otero County, 10 miles (16 km) southeast of the community of Alamogordo.

Sacramento Peak, at 9,262 feet (2,823 m), is a nearby subpeak of Cathey Peak, and is more widely known due to the presence of several observatories on or near its summit. It is located at 32°47′16″N 105°49′15″W, 1.6 miles (2.6 km) southwest of Cathey Peak, and has a topographic prominence of approximately 80 feet (24 m). The Sunspot Solar Observatory is on the summit itself, and the site of this observatory incorporates the small town of Sunspot, less than one-half mile (0.8 km) to the northeast. The Apache Point Observatory is located on a promontory about one-half mile (0.8 km) south of the summit.

Both peaks lie on the high western crest of the Sacramento Mountains, and hence have gentle, forested eastern slopes, and a steep, high escarpment to the west, descending to the Tularosa Basin. Both peaks can be accessed using New Mexico Scenic Byway 6563 from Cloudcroft.
