= Sacramento Mountains (New Mexico) =

Mountain range

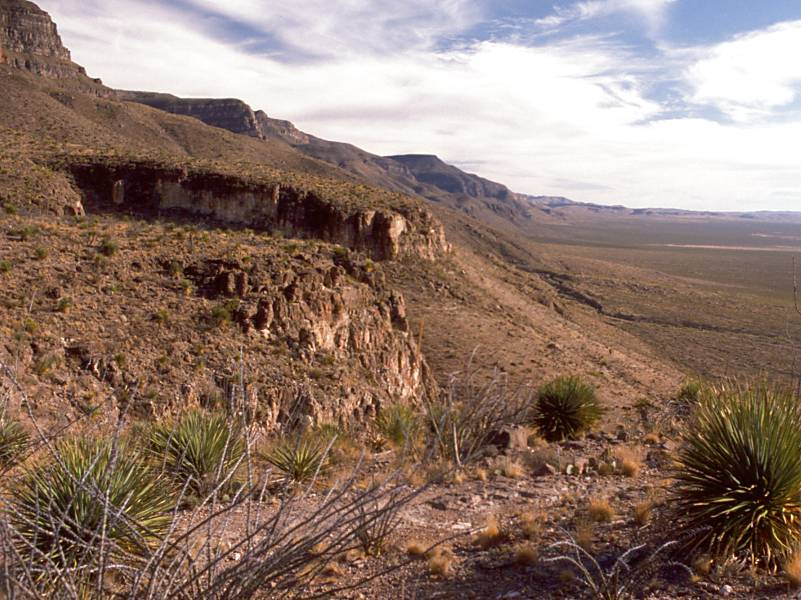
- The western escarpment of the Sacramento Mountains, looking south from Dog Canyon.

Highest point
- Peak: Two unnamed areas (Benson Ridge and Corral Canyon)
- Elevation: 9,695 ft (2,955 m)
- Coordinates: 32°48′27″N 105°47′59″W

Dimensions
- Length: 85 mi (137 km) N-S
- Width: 42 mi (68 km) W-E

Geography
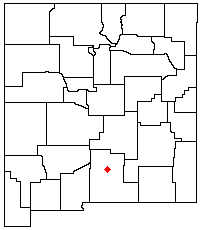
- Location of the Sacramento Mountains within New Mexico
- Country: United States
- State: New Mexico
- Borders on: Guadalupe Mountains; Capitan Mountains

Geology
- Rock type: Limestone

The Sacramento Mountains are a mountain range in the south-central part of the U.S. state of New Mexico, lying just east of Alamogordo in Otero County (small portions of the range lie in Lincoln County and Chaves County). From north to south, the Sacramento Mountains extend for 85 miles (137 km), and from east to west they encompass 42 miles (68 km).

== Geography ==
The Sacramentos can be divided into two sections: a main, northern section, encompassing most of the land area and all of the terrain above 7,500 feet (2,290 m), and a smaller southeastern section, contiguous with the Guadalupe Mountains. Neighboring ranges and landforms include the Tularosa Basin, immediately to the west of the main section of the range; Sierra Blanca and the Capitan Mountains to the northwest and northeast; the Border Hills and the western edge of the broad Pecos River valley to the east; the Guadalupe Mountains to the southeast; and Otero Mesa, which lies south of the main section and southwest of the southeastern section. The Rio Tularosa and the Rio Ruidoso (and hence U.S. Route 70) separate the Sacramentos from Sierra Blanca and the Capitan Mountains. Located at the foothills of the Guadalupe Mountains is Carlsbad Caverns National Park, a series of caverns scattered throughout rugged terrain.

The western edge of the main section of the Sacramento Mountains forms a series of dramatic escarpments leading up to a high ridge, which includes the highest named point in the range, Cathey Peak, 9,645 feet (2,940 m). From this ridge the mountains slope gently down to the east, merging gradually into the Pecos Slope to the west of Artesia. There are actually two unnamed highpoints of the range, both approx 9,695 ft. One is near Sunspot above Corral Canyon and FR 64. The second highpoint is on the crest of Benson Ridge.

== Geology ==
The range is a wide east-dipping fault block, made up almost entirely of limestone. Gypsum deposits washed from the range are a main source of the gypsum sand that makes up the dunes in White Sands National Park. The Sacramento Mountains form the easternmost part of the rift system centered on the rift valley of the Rio Grande. The rock strata in the Sacramentos were originally contiguous with those of the San Andres Mountains on the other side of the Tularosa Basin, and have been separated because of down-faulting of the basin. Unlike the Sacramento Mountains, the neighboring Sierra Blanca is an extrusive igneous complex.

The mountains contain multiple perched aquifers over a deeper regional aquifer. Precipitation (mostly in winter) on the high elevations of the mountains provide most of the groundwater recharge in the Roswell Artesian Basin.

== Land use ==
Most of the main section of the Sacramento Mountains are part of the Lincoln National Forest, though the northern part of the range is included in the Mescalero Apache Indian Reservation. Evidence of Apache presence dates back to the fifteenth century. The range includes the town of Cloudcroft, a popular resort; the town of Ruidoso, also popular for recreation, lies on its northern edge, and Timberon at the southernmost end. The range also includes the National Solar Observatory on Sacramento Peak, midway down the western ridge, just southwest of Cathey Peak. There are numerous hiking trails in the portion of the range that lies within the Lincoln National Forest, there is officially designated wilderness.

== Wildlife ==
The mountains are the only home of the Sacramento prickly poppy (Argemone pinnatisecta), a federally listed endangered plant species, and the Sacramento Mountains thistle (Cirsium vinaceum), a threatened species.

== Image gallery ==
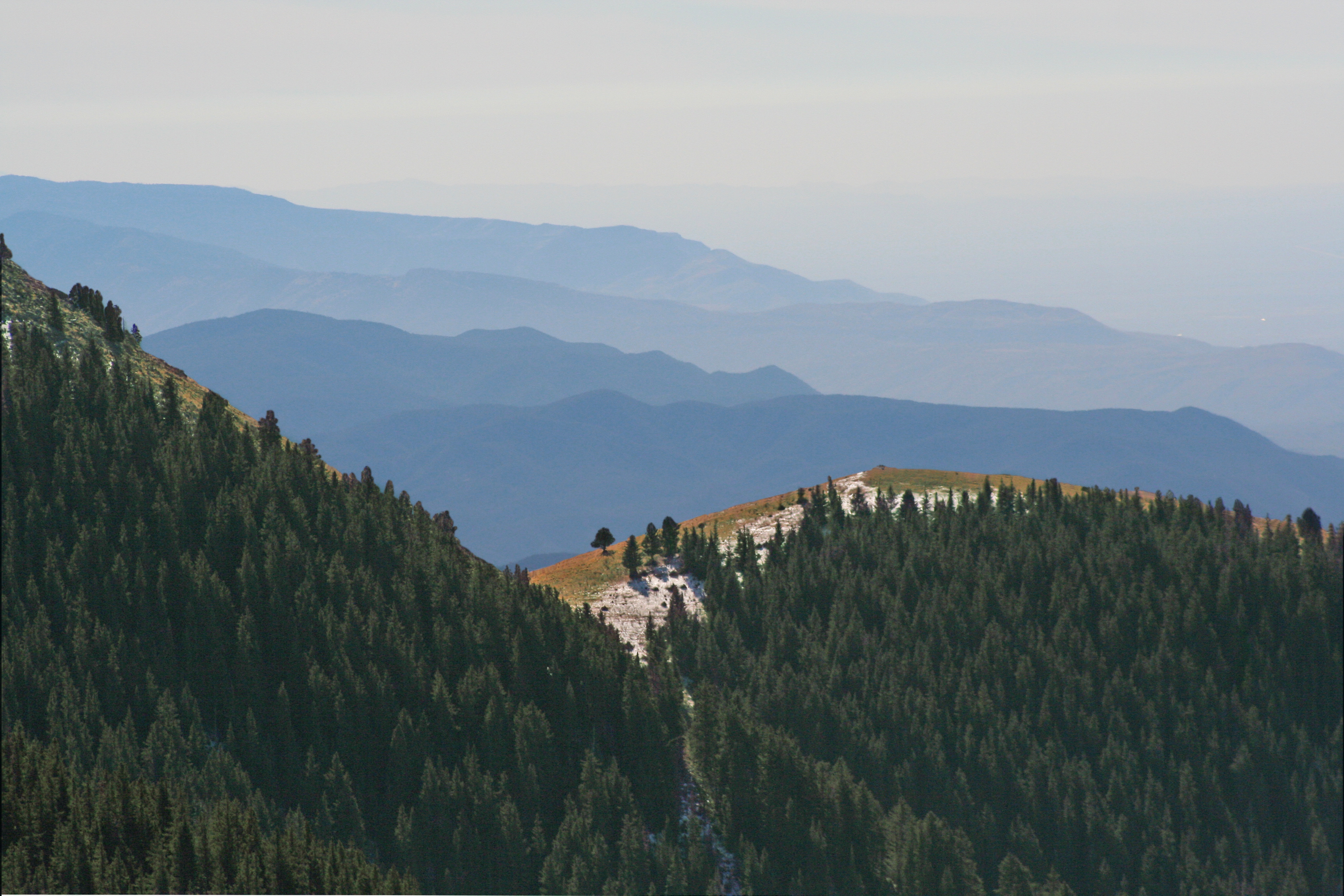
Looking south from the Sacramento Mountains

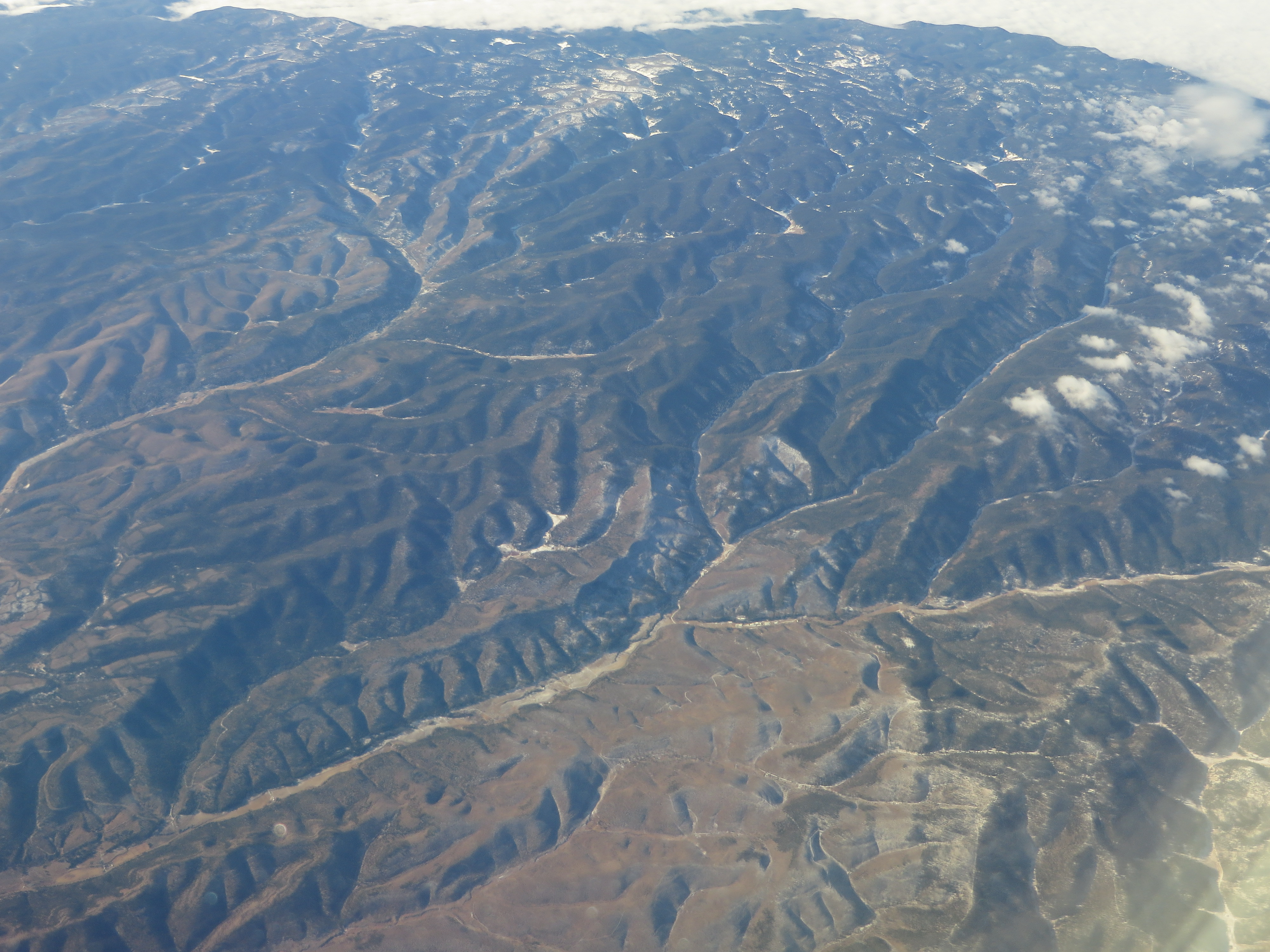
Aerial View of the Sacramento Mountains.

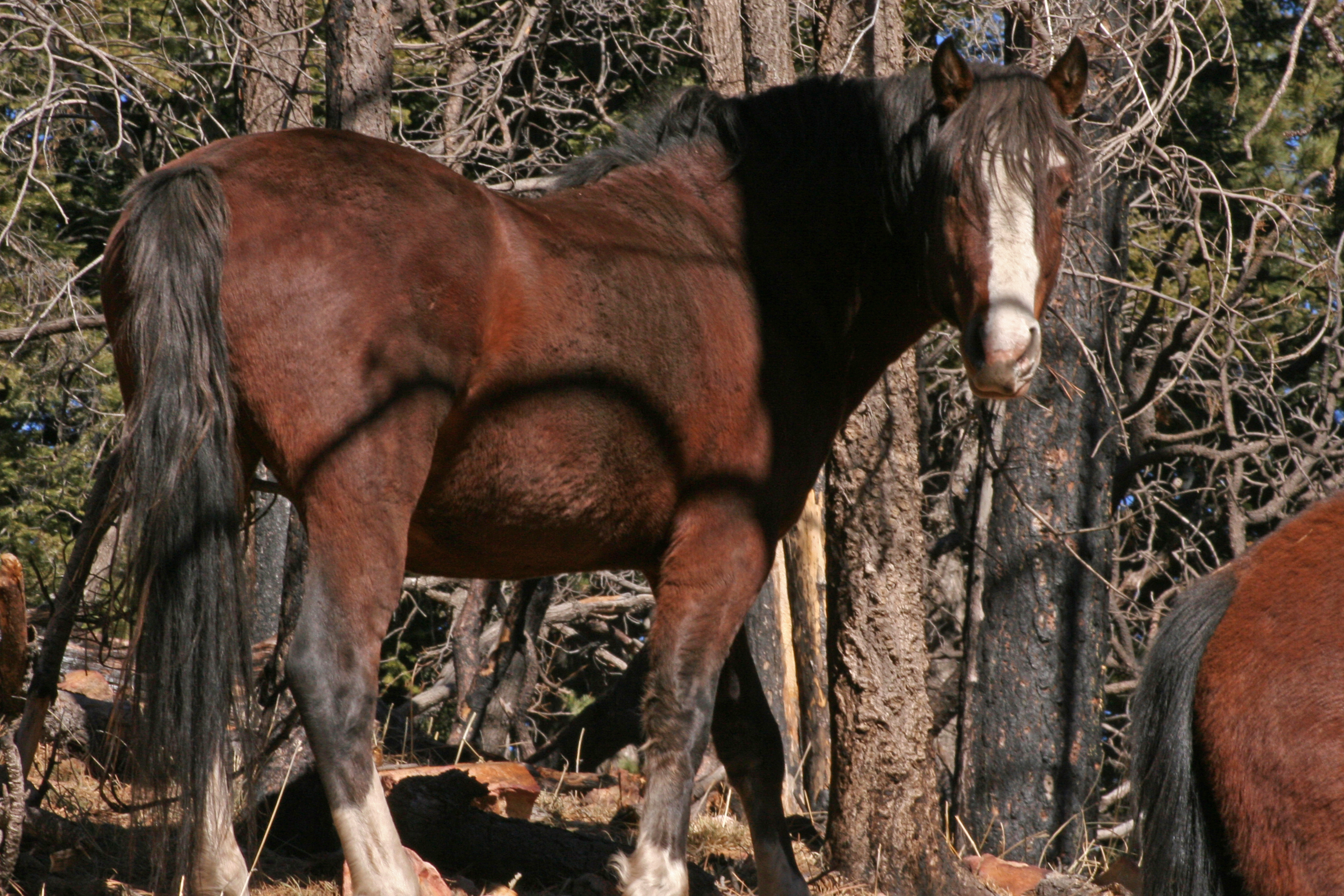
A wild horse in the forest of the Sacramento Mountains

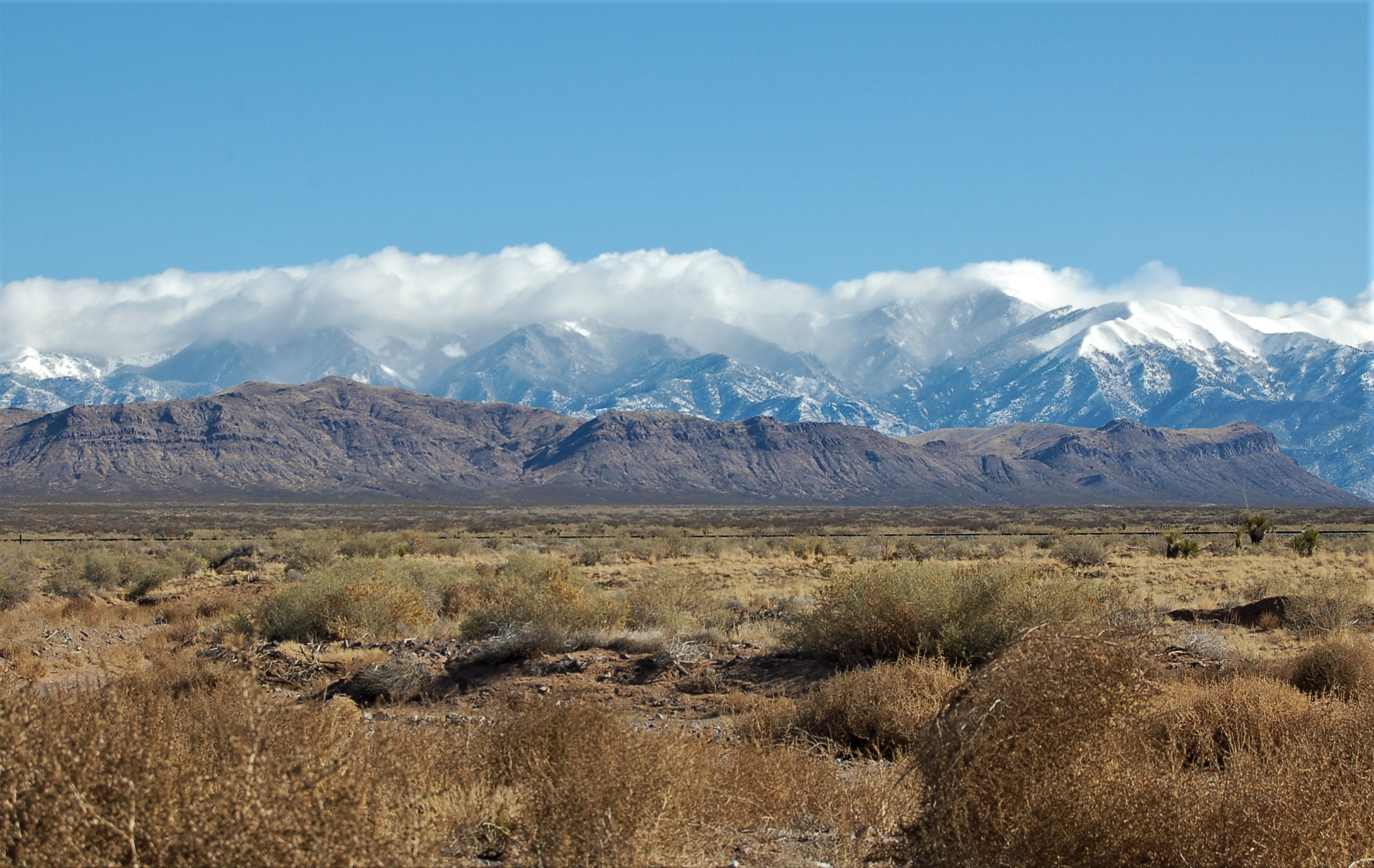
Fresh Snow on the Sacramento Mountains

== See also ==
- Beach Mountains
- Chihuahuan Desert
- Carlsbad Caverns
- Guadalupe Mountains
- Jicarilla Mountains
- Franklin Mountains (Texas)
- Organ Mountains
