= National Solar Observatory =

Observatory in Boulder, Colorado

- Established: 1984
- Research type: basic
- Field of research: Solar physics
- Directors: Christoph Keller
- Staff: around 150
- Location: 3665 Discovery Drive, 3rd Floor, Boulder, CO, 80303, US, Boulder, Colorado, US; 40.0117201°N 105.2454644°W
- Sponsoring agency: National Science Foundation
- Affiliations: University of Colorado Boulder
- Operating agency: Association of Universities for Research in Astronomy
- Website: www.nso.edu

The National Solar Observatory (NSO) is a United States federally funded research and development center for solar physics headquartered in Boulder, Colorado. It was founded in 1984 and is operated by the Association of Universities for Research in Astronomy.

NSO manages several ground-based solar telescopes and observatories including the 4-meter Daniel K. Inouye Solar Telescope at the Haleakala Observatory; the Sunspot Solar Observatory near Sunspot, New Mexico; and six sites around the world for the Global Oscillations Network Group, one of which is shared with the Synoptic Optical Long-term Investigations of the Sun. NSO also operates the NSO Integrated Synoptic Program (NISP), which combines and coordinates synoptic solar observations for research and space weather applications.

== Visiting the observatories ==
The National Solar Observatory Headquarters is located on the campus of the University of Colorado Boulder. It also has some staff on Maui, and Sacramento Peak.

== Telescopes operated by the observatory ==
=== Big Bear Solar Observatory ===
- Synoptic Optical Long-term Investigations of the Sun

=== Haleakala Observatory ===
- Daniel K. Inouye Solar Telescope

=== Sacramento Peak ===
- See Sunspot Solar Observatory for the telescopes located there

=== Global ===
- Global Oscillation Network Group

== Directors ==
A list of all NSO directors since the founding of the observatory is given below.

NSO Director	Dates in office
Robert Howard	1983–1986
John Leibacher	1986–1992
Jacques Beckers	1993–1998
Steve Keil	1999–2013
Valentín Martínez Pillet	2013–2024
Christoph Keller	2024–present

== History ==
The Sacramento Peak observatories were proposed by Donald Menzel of the Harvard College Observatory in 1947, when the U.S. Air Force commissioned a site survey for a suitable facility that would study the higher regions of the Earth's atmosphere. The site, near White Sands Proving Ground, was chosen in 1948. The first equipment to be operated by the Harvard Observatory was installed in 1949, a 6-inch (15 cm) prominence camera, and a flare patrol camera, installed in the Grain Bin Dome.

These instruments were followed by the Evans Solar Facility, or Big Dome, which housed a 16-inch (41 cm) coronograph and spectrograph. In 1963 the Hilltop Dome was built to house additional instruments.

The Sacramento Peak facilities are located in Sunspot, New Mexico. The site's name was chosen by the late James C. Sadler, (1920–2005), an internationally noted meteorologist and professor at The University of Hawaiʻi, formerly with the United States Air Force on assignment during the early inception of the observatory.

For the Solar eclipse of August 21, 2017, the National Solar Observatory enlisted the cooperation of various groups in the Citizen CATE (Continental-America Telescopic Eclipse) experiment to set up more than 60 identical telescopes along the eclipse path, to produce 90 continuous minutes of images, 10 seconds apart, of the Sun's inner corona. This was to provide a clearer understanding of solar plumes and other transient phenomena.

== See also ==
- List of astronomical observatories
