= Association of Universities for Research in Astronomy =

Operating consortium for observatories and telescopes

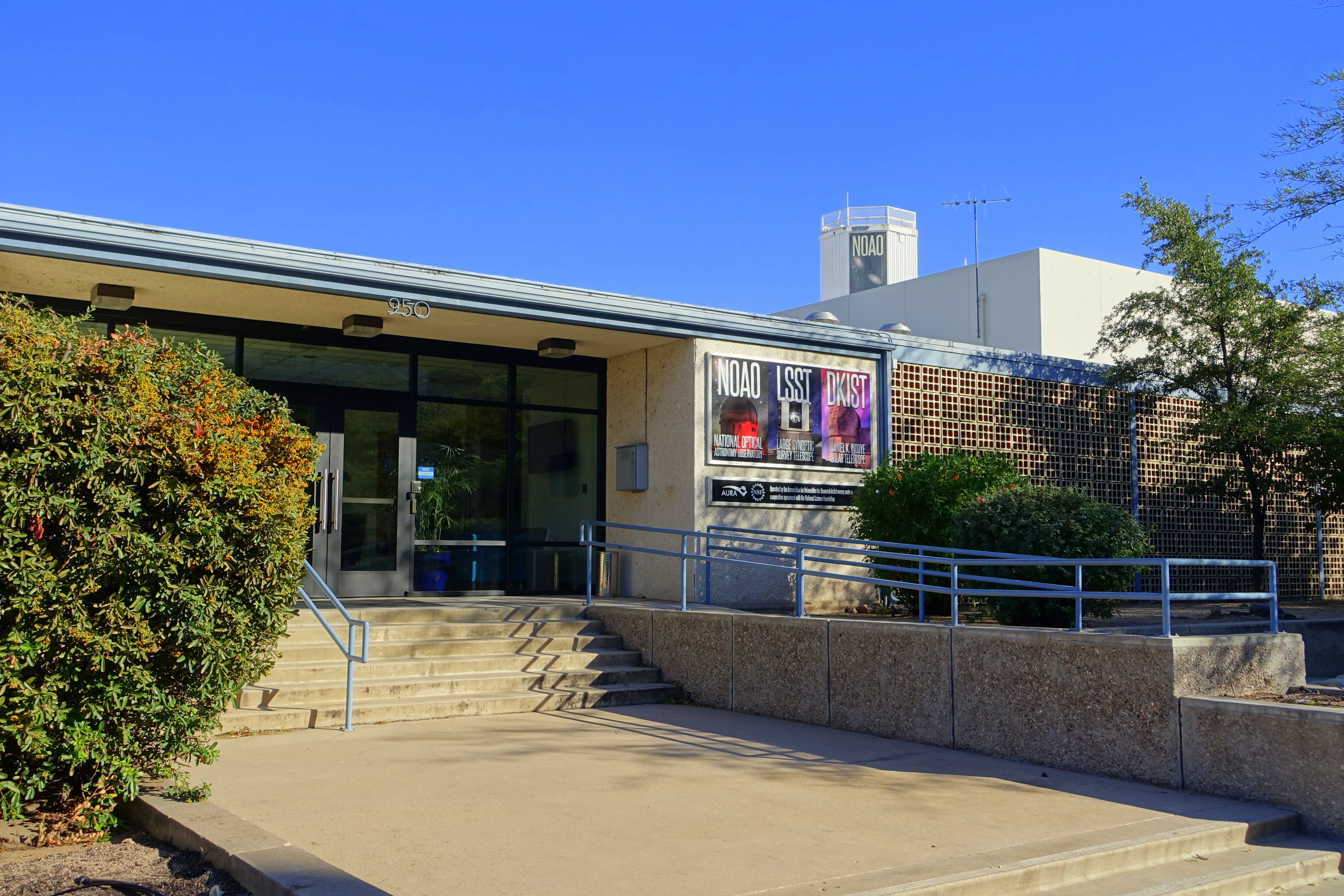
The Association of Universities for Research in Astronomy at the University of Arizona

The Association of Universities for Research in Astronomy (AURA) is a consortium of universities and other institutions that operates astronomical observatories and telescopes.

Founded October 10, 1957, with the encouragement of the National Science Foundation (NSF), AURA was incorporated by a group of seven U.S. universities: UC Santa Cruz, Chicago, Harvard, Indiana, Michigan, Ohio State, and Wisconsin. The first meeting of the board of directors took place in Ann Arbor, Michigan. Today, AURA has 49 member institutions in the United States and 2 international affiliate members.

AURA began as a small organization dedicated to ground-based optical astronomy, managing a range of 1- to 4-meter telescopes and providing community advocacy for optical/infrared astronomy. Over the years, AURA expanded its focus to include Solar Astronomy and the Gemini 8-meter telescopes, going on to partner with other consortia such as WIYN (Wisconsin Indiana Yale & NOAO) and SOAR (Southern Astrophysical Research). In the 1980s, AURA took on the management of the Space Telescope Science Institute, opening up the ultraviolet, optical, and infrared wavelength bands in space with the Hubble Space Telescope and in infrared space astronomy with the James Webb Space Telescope (JWST).

AURA is responsible for the successful management and operation of its three centers: NSF's National Optical-Infrared Astronomy Research Laboratory (NOIRLab); the NSF's National Solar Observatory (NSO); and the Space Telescope Science Institute (STScI).

In 2025, AURA received a total of $478.5 million in grants from the U.S federal government, mostly from NASA and the NSF.

== Centers ==
- NSF's NOIRLab is the US national center for ground-based, nighttime optical astronomy. The mission of NOIRLab is to enable breakthrough discoveries in astrophysics by developing and operating state-of-the-art ground-based observatories and providing data products and services for a diverse and inclusive community. Through its five Programs — Cerro Tololo Inter-American Observatory (CTIO), the Community Science and Data Center (CSDC), International Gemini Observatory, Kitt Peak National Observatory (KPNO) and Vera C. Rubin Observatory — NSF's NOIRLab serves as a focal point for community development of innovative scientific programs, the exchange of ideas, and creative development.
- NSF's National Solar Observatory (NSO) - AURA operates NSO which is located in Boulder, Colorado and at the Daniel K. Inouye Solar Telescope (DKIST) in Maui, Hawaii.
- Space Telescope Science Institute (STScI) - AURA manages STScI for NASA to carry out the science mission of the Hubble Space Telescope and to carry out the operations and science missions of the James Webb Space Telescope.

== President ==
Dr. Matt Mountain was appointed president of the Association of Universities for Research in Astronomy (AURA) on 1 March 2015. The president, as the chief executive officer, serves as the primary representative or spokesperson for AURA. The president is a member of the board of directors and implements policy decisions of the board. The president serves the board of directors as its principal executive officer, providing leadership and guidance on policy matters, coordinating the activities of the board and its various committees. The president is also responsible for maintaining effective working relationships with AURA Member Universities.

== AURA Board of Directors ==
The board, which meets quarterly, establishes the policies of AURA, approves its budget, elects members of the Management Councils, and appoints the president, the center directors, and other principal officers. The board of directors is responsible to the member representatives for the effective management of AURA and the achievement of its purposes.

== Members ==
Today, there are 49 U.S. Member Institutions and 2 International Affiliate Members which comprise the Member Institutions of AURA. The president of each member institution designates a member representative who has a voice in AURA matters. Together, the member representatives act upon membership applications.

List of members as of 2026:

- Boston University
- California Institute of Technology
- Carnegie Institution for Science
- Carnegie Mellon University
- Cornell University
- Fisk University
- Georgia State University
- Harvard University
- Indiana University Bloomington
- Iowa State University
- Johns Hopkins University
- Keck Northeast Astronomy Consortium - a consortium of liberal arts colleges, including Colgate University, Haverford College (partnership with Bryn Mawr College), Middlebury College, Swarthmore College, Vassar College, Wellesley College, Wesleyan University, and Williams College.
- Massachusetts Institute of Technology
- Michigan State University
- Montana State University
- New Jersey Institute of Technology
- New Mexico Institute of Mining and Technology
- New Mexico State University
- Ohio State University
- Pennsylvania State University
- Pontificia Universidad Catolica de Chile
- Princeton University
- Rutgers University
- Smithsonian Astrophysical Observatory
- Stanford University
- Stony Brook University
- Texas A&M University
- Universidad de Chile
- University of Arizona
- University of California, Berkeley
- University of California, Santa Cruz
- University of California, Los Angeles
- University of Chicago
- University of Colorado Boulder
- University of Florida
- University of Hawaiʻi - system administers the Institute for Astronomy, Manoa administers educational programs
- University of Illinois Urbana-Champaign
- University of Maryland, College Park
- University of Michigan
- University of Minnesota, Twin Cities
- University of North Carolina at Chapel Hill
- University of Pittsburgh
- University of Texas at Austin
- University of Texas at San Antonio
- University of Toledo
- University of Utah
- University of Virginia
- University of Washington
- University of Wisconsin-Madison
- Vanderbilt University
- Yale University

== Honours ==
The asteroid 19912 Aurapenenta was named in honour of the association's fiftieth anniversary, on 1 June 2007.†

== See also ==
- List of astronomical societies

== Literature ==
- Frank K. Edmondson. AURA and Its US National Observatories. — Cambridge University Press, 1997. — 367 p. — ISBN 9780521553452. — ISBN 0521553458.
