= Linda Sparke =

British astronomer

Linda Siobhan Sparke is a British astronomer known for her research on the structure and dynamics of galaxies. She is a professor emerita of astronomy at the University of Wisconsin–Madison, and Explorers Program Scientist in the NASA Astrophysics Division.

== Education and career ==
Sparke was born in London, and read mathematics as an undergraduate at the University of Cambridge. She completed a Ph.D. in astronomy in 1981 from the University of California, Berkeley; her dissertation was Swirling Gas Flows in Elliptical Galaxies.

After postdoctoral research at the Institute for Advanced Study, the University of Cambridge, and the Kapteyn Astronomical Institute, she became a faculty member at the University of Wisconsin–Madison. She retired in 2010 to become a professor emeritus, served as a program manager at the National Science Foundation for two years, and became research program manager in astrophysics at NASA and later Explorers Program Scientist at NASA.

== Book ==
With John Gallagher III, Sparke is the author of the undergraduate textbook Galaxies in the Universe: an Introduction (Cambridge University Press, 2000; 2nd ed., 2006).

== Recognition ==
Sparke was elected as a Fellow of the American Physical Society in 2002, after a nomination from the APS Division of Astrophysics. The fellowship citation noted her "studies of the structure and dynamics of galaxies, using orbital motions to probe both time-steady and time-varying gravitational potentials, and the distribution of dark matter". In 2020 she was named a Fellow of the American Astronomical Society (AAS), as one of 200 Legacy Fellows named to start the AAS Fellows program.

Her book Galaxies in the Universe: an Introduction won the Chambliss Astronomical Writing Award of the American Astronomical Society in 2008.
