= Chambliss Astronomical Writing Award =

American Astronomical Society prize for academic writing

The Chambliss Astronomical Writing Award is awarded by the American Astronomical Society for astronomy writing for an academic audience, specifically textbooks at either the upper-division undergraduate level or the graduate level. The award is one of three AAS medal programs established by Dr. Carlson R. Chambliss, Professor Emeritus of astronomy of Kutztown University, Pennsylvania.

Books suitable for this award must be currently available in North America. Criteria include depth and focus, organization, clarity and effective study aids and exercises. A single gold medal is given, and if the winning book has multiple authors, the $1,000 monetary award is divided, and multiple certificates issued.

Year	Recipient	Book	Publisher
2006	Barbara Ryden	Introduction to Cosmology (2003)	Addison-Wesley
2007	Imke de Pater, Jack Lissauer	Planetary Sciences (2001)	Cambridge University Press
2008	Linda S. Sparke, John Gallagher III	Galaxies in the Universe: An Introduction (2007)	Cambridge University Press
2009	Dan Maoz	Astrophysics in a Nutshell (2007)	Princeton University Press
2010	Hale Bradt	Astrophysics Processes: The Physics of Astronomical Phenomena (2008)	Cambridge University Press
2011	Caleb A. Scharf	Extrasolar Planets and Astrobiology (2009)	University Science Books (now MIT Press)
2012	Abraham Loeb	How Did the First Stars and Galaxies Form? (2010)	Princeton University Press
2013	George Rieke	Measuring the Universe: A Multiwavelength Perspective (2012)	Cambridge University Press
2018	Kevin Heng	Exoplanetary Atmospheres: Theoretical Concepts and Foundations (2017)	Princeton University Press
2019	David Branch, J. Craig Wheeler	Supernova Explosions (2017)	Springer Nature
2020	Thomas Burbine	Asteroids: Astronomical and Geological Bodies (2017)	Cambridge University Press
2022	Daniel Baumann	Cosmology (2022)	Cambridge University Press
2023	Henny J.G.L.M. Lamers, Emily Levesque	Understanding Stellar Evolution (2017)	IOP Publishing
2024	Viviana Acquaviva	Machine Learning for Physics and Astronomy (2023)	Princeton University Press
2025	Dragan Huterer	A Course in Cosmology: From Theory to Practice (2023)	Cambridge University Press
2026	Marc Pinsonneault, Barbara Ryden	Stellar Structure and Evolution (2023)	Cambridge University Press

== See also ==
- List of astronomy awards
