= Dara Norman =

Astronomer

Dara J. Norman
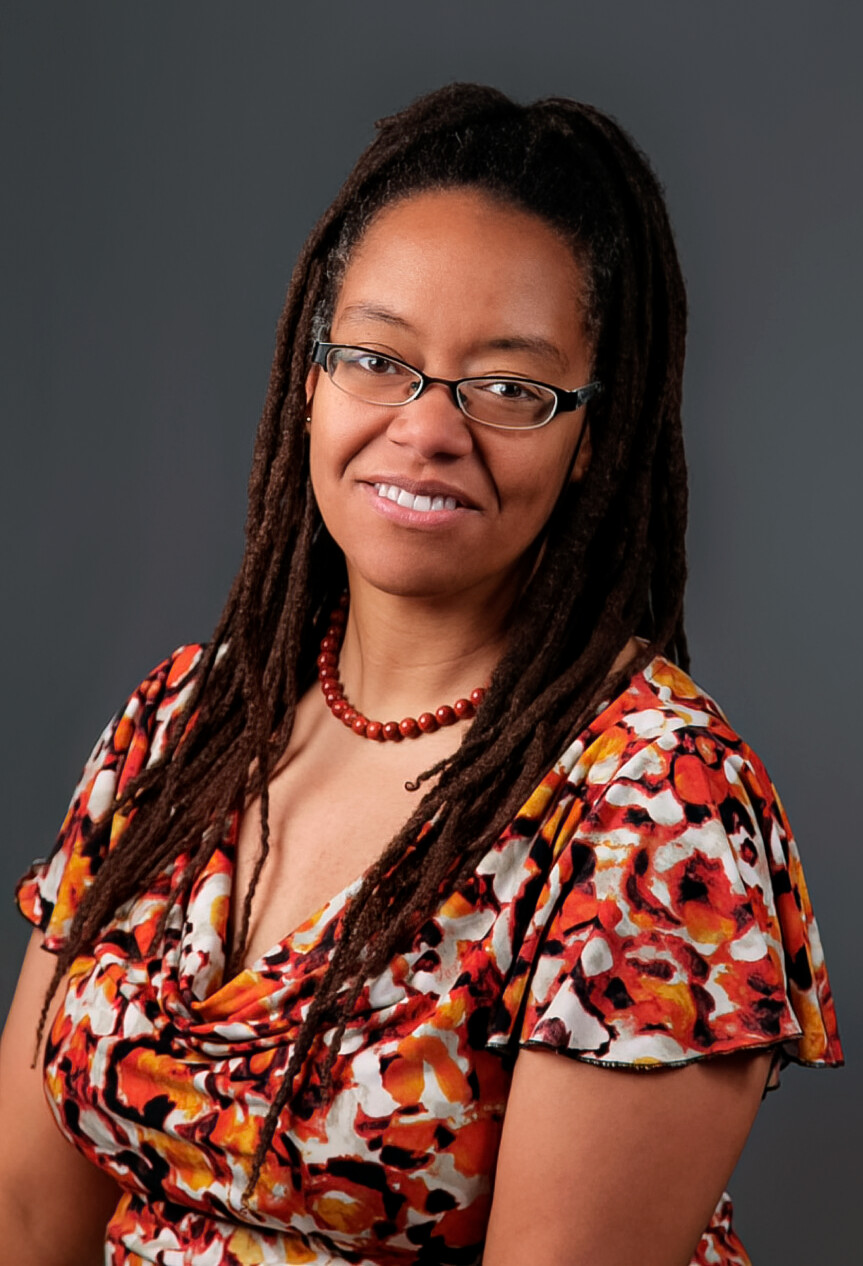
- Norman in 2023
- Education: Massachusetts Institute of Technology, BS (1988); University of Washington, MS (1994); University of Washington, PhD (1999)
- Scientific career
- Fields: Astronomy
- Workplaces: National Optical-Infrared Astronomy Research Laboratory
- Doctoral advisor: Craig Hogan, Chris Impey

Dara J. Norman is an astronomer and the deputy director of the Community Science and Data Center at the National Science Foundation's National Optical-Infrared Astronomy Research Laboratory (NOIRLab) in Tucson, Arizona. Dr. Norman is currently the 50th president of the American Astronomical Society. She was formerly the Association of Universities for Research in Astronomy Diversity Advocate at NOAO. Her research centers on the influence of Active Galactic Nuclei (AGN) on the evolution of galaxies. In 2020, she was inducted into the inaugural cohort of American Astronomical Society Fellows in recognition of her leadership and achievements.

== Education and early career ==
Norman grew up on the south side of Chicago, Illinois where she developed a love of astronomy, influenced by her mother, who was a fan of science fiction and the United States Space program. As a child, she wanted to grow up to be an astronomer; Norman was heavily inspired by her visits to the Adler Planetarium. She attended Kenwood Academy in the Hyde Park neighborhood, where she furthered her interest in science through resources made available by the University of Chicago, such as its biannual open house days. Upon entering Massachusetts Institute of Technology she began to study under the mentorship of James Elliott, who was known for his leadership of the team that discovered Uranus's rings. Norman has shared that early in her undergraduate career, she suffered from anxiety and panic attacks due to an overwhelming course load—balancing core physics, electrical engineering, and Japanese. The strong mentorship she received from Professor Jim Elliot was pivotal in helping her succeed. She received her Bachelor of Science degree in 1988 in Earth, Atmospheric and Planetary Science.

After completing her undergraduate studies, Norman worked at NASA's Goddard Space Flight Center for three years. While presenting her research at the 1992 American Astronomical Society meeting, she met Bruce Margon, the chairman of the University of Washington's Astronomy department where she had recently applied to attend graduate school. The two had recently observed the same active galaxy using the Hubble Space Telescope, which they discussed during Norman's poster presentation. Norman was ultimately admitted to the university's graduate program and began in the fall of 1992.Norman received her Doctorate degree in 1999, becoming the first African American woman to earn her Ph.D. in astronomy at the university. During her doctoral work, she specialized in gravitational lensing studied quasars. Following her doctoral work, Norman worked as a post-doctoral researcher at Stony Brook University. Subsequently, she became a National Science Foundation Astronomy and Astrophysics Postdoctoral Fellow, working at the National Optical Astronomy Observatory (NOAO) with the Deep Lens Survey team. In that role, she worked to understand how observed galaxies are magnified by gravitational lensing and how this so-called "magnification bias" affects our view of the universe.

== Career ==
=== Research ===
Norman is now an associate scientist and the deputy director of the Community Science and Data Center (CSDC) at the National Optical-Infrared Astronomy Research Laboratory (NOIRLab), which operates NOAO as of October 1, 2019. Her research interests have evolved to focus on Active Galactic Nuclei (AGN), which are compact regions at the center of galaxies that are thought to be powered by supermassive black holes. AGN, which can be more luminous than an entire galaxy of stars, form as stars and gases are accreted through the activity of a supermassive black hole. Norman's research seeks to understand how these active galaxies form and why some of them are brighter than others.

=== Diversity, equity, and inclusion work ===
Norman is recognized as a leader in workforce development, including diversity, equity, and inclusion, serving as the Association of Universities for Research in Astronomy Diversity Advocate at NOAO. In this role, she works on establishing and implementing recruitment and retention initiatives for minorities and women in astronomy. She also served as a member of the American Astronomical Society's Committee on the Status of Minorities in Astronomy. She has served as an expert panelist in a number of National Academy of Sciences studies, which have culminated in the Academies' 2013 report on advancing women of color in academia and a 2018 report on sexual harassment in the sciences. Her advocacy efforts around inclusion focus on two areas of access: (1) broad access to sitting on advisory committees and leadership boards, ensuring that these groups are representative of the communities they seek to serve, and (2) access to large datasets, ensuring that the requisite training and infrastructure is available. In order to address the latter, she and her colleagues have advocated for making coding and development training widely available across the astronomy and astrophysics workforce, regardless of academic affiliation or career stage. She has noted that data access is becoming a prerequisite for telescope access, which is an essential component in advancing astronomers' research and careers. In an attempt to make astronomy more diverse and inclusive, in 2010 Norman created a 10 year plan to provide an easier path for minorities to get into astronomy. After looking at a survey done in 2020 by National Academies' Decadal, it shows that Norman's advocacy work has opened up more opportunities for minorities to engage in astronomy.

== Awards and honors ==
- Distinguished Alumni Timeless Award, University of Washington, 2012
- Elected Legacy Fellow, American Astronomical Society, 2020
- Washington NASA Space Grant Fellowship
- Arthur B.C. Walker Award, 2026
