= Catherine Pilachowski =

American astronomer

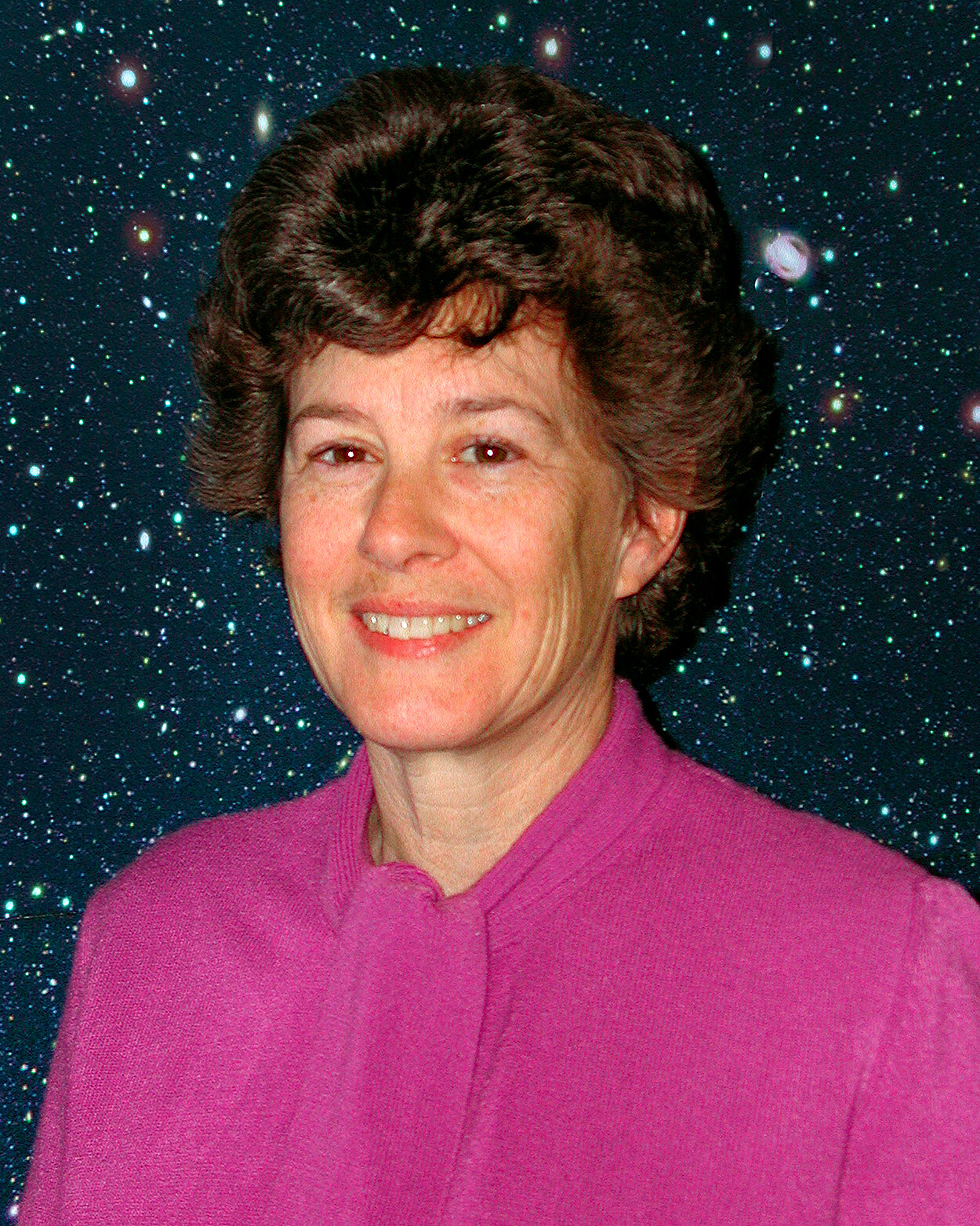
- Born: Catherine Anderson Pilachowski; 1949 (age 76–77); Sacramento, California, U.S.
- Education: Harvey Mudd College (B.S.); University of Hawaii (M.S., Ph.D.)
- Scientific career
- Fields: Astronomy
- Workplaces: National Optical Astronomy Observatory; Indiana University Bloomington
- Thesis: The Luminosities and Compositions of a Group of Mildly Peculiar Late-Type Giant Stars (1975)
- Doctoral advisor: Walter Bonsack

Catherine Anderson Pilachowski (born 1949) is an American astronomer, professor and Kirkwood Chair in astronomy at Indiana University Bloomington. She is a fellow at the American Association for the Advancement of Science and former president of the American Astronomical Society.

== Early life and education ==
Pilachowski was born and raised in California. She has stated that growing up during the Space Race between the United States and the Soviet Union led to her interest in becoming an astronomer.

She received her B.S. in Physics in 1971 from Harvey Mudd College in California and an M.S. and Ph.D. in 1975 from the University of Hawaii.

== Career ==
Pilachowski is a fellow at the American Association for the Advancement of Science and the American Astronomical Society. She was president of the American Astronomical Society from 2002 to 2004. For over twenty years, she was a staff astronomer at the National Optical Astronomy Observatory's Kitt Peak Observatory in Tucson, Arizona, where she served as project scientist for the design and construction of the WIYN Telescope.

Pilachowski became a professor of astronomy at Indiana University and in 2001 was named the Daniel Kirkwood Chair in the Department of Astronomy.

Pilachowski specializes in understanding the spectra of starlight. Her work has included searching for the molecular species hydrogen fluoride.

== Publications ==
- Chemical abundances of open clusters from high-resolution infrared spectra - II. NGC 752 Bocek Topcu, G.; Afsar, M.; Sneden, C.; Pilachowski, et al. 2020, MNRAS, 491, 544
- Carbon and Oxygen Isotopic Ratios. II. Semiregular Variable M Giants Lebzelter, T.; Hinkle, K. H.; Straniero, O.; Lambert, D. L.; Pilachowski, C. A.; Nault, Kr. A. 2019, AJ, 886, 117L
- Phosphorus Abundances in the Hyades and Galactic Disk Maas, Z. G.; Cescutti, G.;Pilachowski, C. A. 2019, AJ, 158, 219
- Chemical Abundances of Open Clusters From High-Resolution Infrared Spectra. II. NGC 752 Bocek Topcu, G.; Afsar, M.; Sneden, C.; Pilachowski, C. A. et al. 2020, MNRAS,
- Chemical abundances of open clusters from high-resolution infrared spectra - I. NGC 6940 Bocek Topcu, G.; Afsar, M.; Sneden, C.; Pilachowski, C. A. et al. 2019, MNRAS, 485, 4625
- Carbon Isotope Ratios in M10 Giants Maas, Z. G.; Gerber, J. M.; Deibel, Alex; Pilachowski, C. A. 2019, ApJ, 878, 43
- Chlorine Isotope Ratios in M Giants Maas, Z. G., Pilachowski, C. A. 2018, AJ, 156, 2
- Is the Young Star RZ Piscium Consuming Its Own (Planetary) Offspring? Punzi, K. M., Kastner, J. H. et al. 2018, AJ, 155, 33.
- Photometric Detection of Multiple Populations in Globular Clusters Using Integrated Light Bowman, W. P., Pilachowski, C. A., van Zee, L., Winans, A., Ciardullo, R., Gronwall, C. 2017, AJ, 154, 131.
- Photometric and radial-velocity time series of RR Lyrae stars in M3: analysis of single-mode variables Jurcsik, J., Smitola, P. et al. 2017, MNRAS, 468, 1317.
- Phosphorus Abundances in FGK Stars Maas, Z. G., Pilachowski, C. A., Cescutti, G. 2017, ApJ, 841, 108.
- Differences in the rotational properties of multiple stellar populations in M13: a faster rotation for the `extreme' chemical subpopulation Cordero, M. J., Henault-Brunet, V., Pilachowski, C. A., Balbinot, E., Johnson, C. I., Varri, A. L. 2017, MNRAS, 465, 3515
- An Archive of Spectra from the Mayall Fourier Transform Spectrometer at Kitt Peak Pilachowski, C. A., Hinkle, K. H., Young, M. D., Dennis, H. B., Gopu, A., Henschel, R., Hayashi, S. 2017, PASP, 129, 024006.
- The M Dwarf Eclipsing Binary CU Cancri Wilson, R. E., Pilachowski, C. A., Terrell, D. 2017, ApJ, 835, 251.
- The Abundance of Lithium in an ABG Star in the Globular Cluster M3 (NGC 5272) Givens, R. A., Pilachowski, C. A. 2016, PASP, 128, 124203.
