= Alberto Conti =

Italian-American astrophysicist (born 1966)

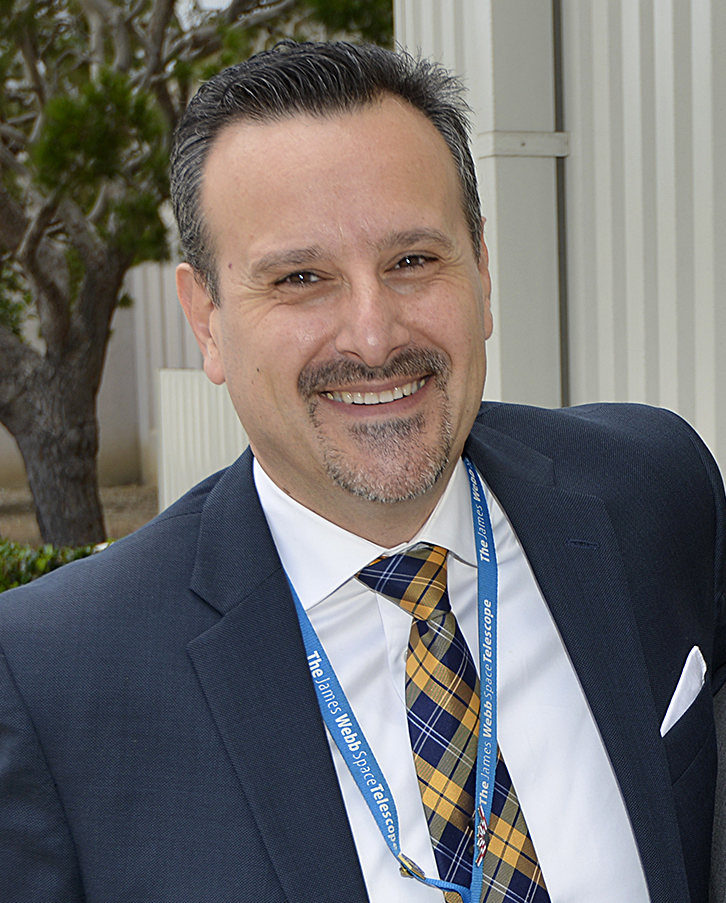
- Conti in California, 2015
- Born: September 27, 1966 (age 59); Palmanova, Italy
- Education: Ohio State University
- Known for: GoogleSky (Sky in Google Earth)
- Awards: The Hunt for Planet B, Pirelli Internetional Award
- Scientific career
- Fields: Astrophysics
- Workplaces: BAE Systems Inc.
- Doctoral advisor: Barbara Ryden; Patrick Osmer; David Weinberg

Alberto Conti (born September 27, 1966), is an astrophysicist and the Vice President for Strategic Operations at BAE Systems Inc. He is one of the creators of the GoogleSky concept, of the idea of astronomical outreach at South by SouthWest 2013 and of the James Webb Space Telescope iBook. He is also the Executive Producer of the Emmy Winning CNN Films The Hunt for Planet B.

== Professional career ==
Conti was born in Palmanova, Italy. He received his laurea degree in physics from the University of Trieste, Italy, with a thesis titled "Binary Galaxies in the Center for Astrophysics | Harvard & Smithsonian (CfA) Redshift Survey." During the following two years, he worked on the largest sample (at the time) of optical rotation curves of galaxies at the International School for Advanced Studies (SISSA), in Trieste. There he developed algorithms to automate the extraction of physical parameters from galactic rotation curves, paving the way for the analysis of much larger samples. He has since specialized in statistical methods, computational astrophysics, and large datasets.

in 2000 Conti graduated from the Ohio State University with a Ph.D. thesis on correlating galactic properties with the physics of galaxy formation. He then became a postdoctoral researcher at the Department of Physics and Astronomy of the University of Pittsburgh where he focused on the star formation history of galaxies.

In 2003, Conti joined the Space Telescope Science Institute (STScI) to co-lead the development of a new archive for the Galaxy Evolution Explorer (GALEX). He integrated this effort with work on the National Virtual Observatory.

In January 2005, he became Branch Manager for the Astronomy Tools and Applications (ASTTA) branch at STScI's Engineering System and Software Division. ASTTA develops some of the best-known software products for the astronomical community, such as Astronomer Proposal Tool, PyRAF, and Multidrizzle.

At the 15th annual ADASS conference in October 2005, Conti became interested in the Google Earth software that allows anyone to browse Earth with a simple point-and-click interface. Back at STScI he sent a proposal to John Hanke, the Head of Google Earth and Google Maps, to extend the Google Earth interface to space-based data. Hanke agreed to have Brian McClendon establish a project plan for such a product, called GoogleSky.

In September 2006, Conti became Chief Engineer for the Data Management System at STScI. Following his involvement with Google he became Development Manager at STScI's Community Missions Office (CMO). CMO serves as the conduit between mission teams and STScI personnel to ensure support for mission science operations, data archiving, grants administration, peer review and education/outreach.

In 2008 Conti received first prize in the Pirelli Internetional Award for the development of GoogleSky.

In 2010, Conti became the Archive Scientist for the Multimission Archive at Space Telescope, the NASA UV and Optical data archive.

In 2011, Conti became the Innovation Scientist for the James Webb Space Telescope, NASA's premier space observatory of the next decade.

In 2013, Conti became the Innovation Manager for the Civil Air and Space at Northrop Grumman Corporation.

In 2018, Conti became the Director for New Business and Innovative Solutions at Ball Aerospace & Technologies.

In 2022, Conti was honored with an Emmy by the National Academy of Television Arts and Sciences (NATAS) as an Executive Producer of the CNN Films The Hunt for Planet B. Directed by Nathaniel Khan, The Hunt for Planet B is a human drama behind NASA's high-stakes James Webb Space Telescope which launched on December 25, 2021. In this same year, he was promoted to vice president and General Manager for the Civil Space Strategic Business Unit at Ball Aerospace & Technologies

In 2025, Conti was promoted to vice president for strategic operations at BAE Systems Inc.
