= Andrea Dupree =

American astrophysicist

Andrea K. Dupree
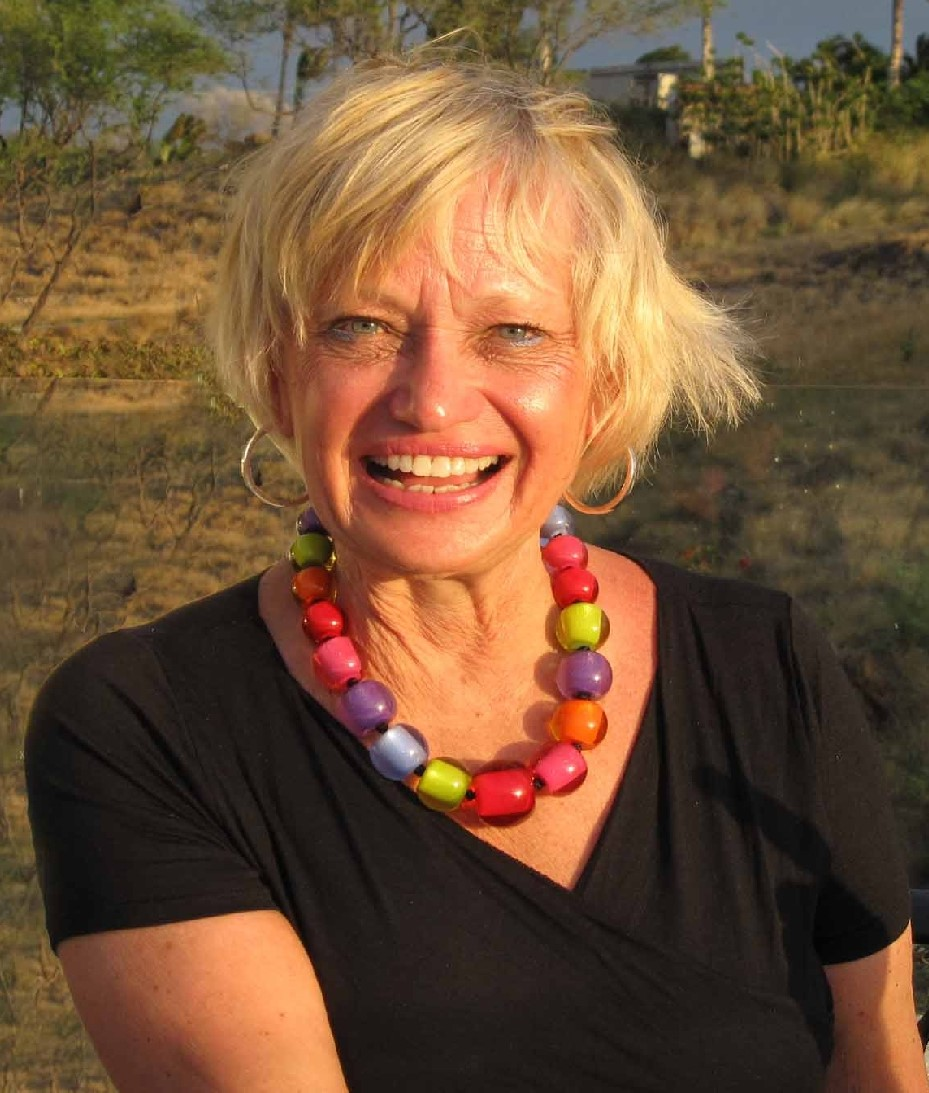
- Astrophysicist Andrea Dupree
- Born: September 17, 1939 (age 86); Boston, Massachusetts
- Education: Wellesley College, 1960, Harvard University, 1968
- Scientific career
- Fields: Astrophysics
- Workplaces: Center for Astrophysics | Harvard & Smithsonian
- Thesis: Analysis of Emission Lines from the Solar Corona (1968)

Andrea Dupree is a senior astrophysicist at the Center for Astrophysics | Harvard & Smithsonian. She is a former president of the American Astronomical Society, and served as the associate director of the Center for Astrophysics | Harvard & Smithsonian. Dupree also served as head of the Solar, Stellar and Planetary Sciences Division.

== Early life ==
Andrea Kundsin Dupree was born September 17, 1939, to parents Edwin and Ruth. She is the oldest sibling, with a younger brother, Dennis Edwin Kundsin.

== Education and career ==
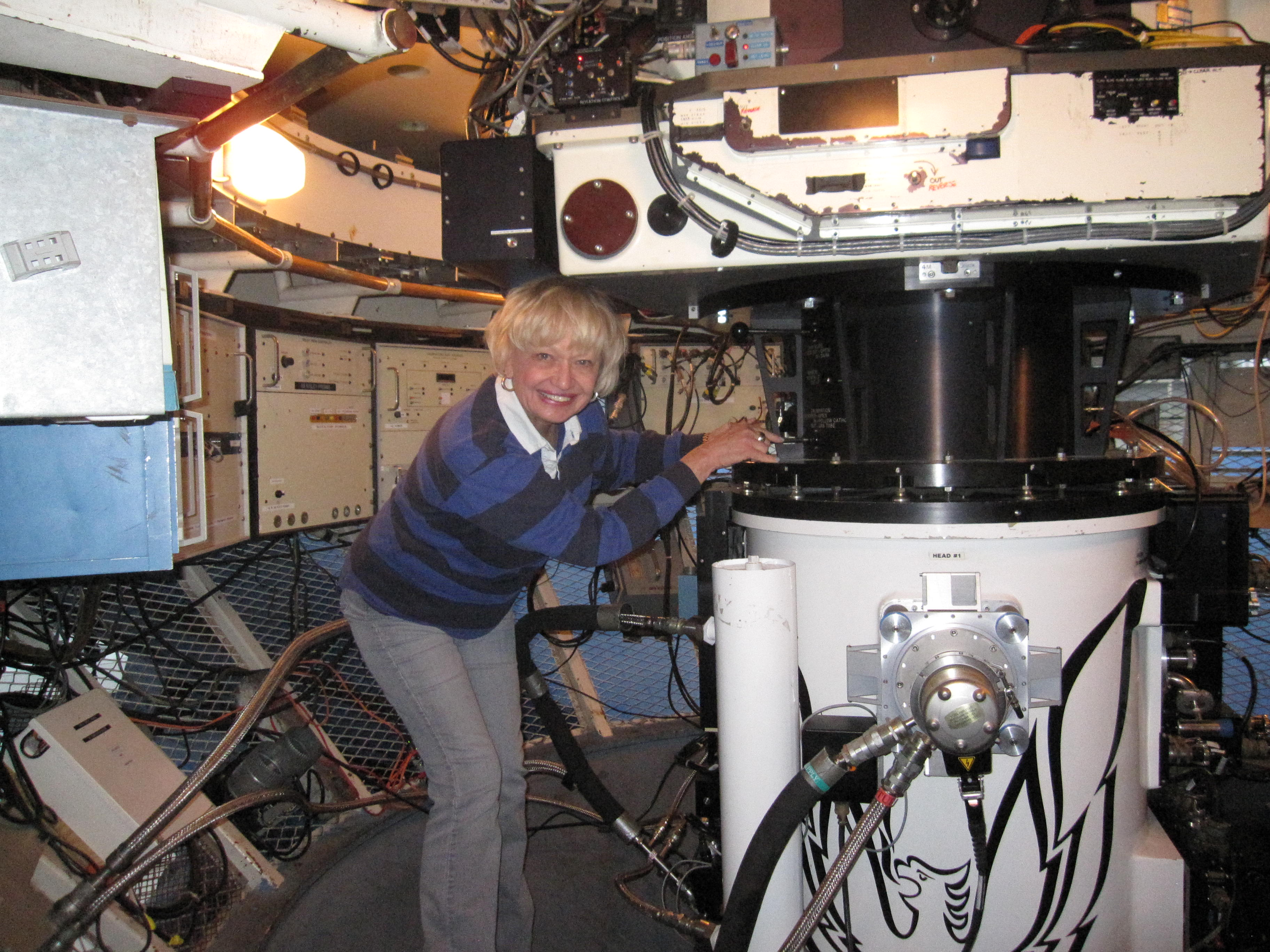
Dupree, Harvard-Smithsonian Center for Astrophysics, at the cassegrain focus of the 4-m Mayall telescope of the National Optical Astronomy Observatories, Kitt Peak, AZ

Dupree attended Wellesley College, and graduated with a bachelor's degree in Liberal Arts in 1960. She knew she wanted to go into the sciences, and her favorite subjects were geology and astronomy. In a 2007 interview, she said, "I'm sure I would’ve been a geologist if the coin had ended up heads instead of tails." After graduating from Wellesley, she briefly studied at University of California, Berkeley, before enrolling in graduate school at Radcliffe in 1961. The Radcliffe Graduate School merged with Harvard University in 1963, and Dupree graduated with her PhD in astrophysics from Harvard in 1968. Her graduate thesis was titled Analysis of Emission Lines from the Solar Corona.

Dupree has worked as an astrophysicist at the Center for Astrophysics | Harvard & Smithsonian since 1968. In 1980, she became the first woman and youngest person to serve as the associate director of the Center for Astrophysics. From 1996 to 1998, she served as the president of the American Astronomical Society. Dupree is an internationally recognized leader in stellar physics, and the bulk of her research is on stars like the Sun.

Dupree recorded an oral history with the American Institute of Physics in 2007.

She was elected a Legacy Fellow of the American Astronomical Society in 2020.

== Awards and honors ==
She received the Smithsonian Scholarly Studies Award in 2019 and 2020.
