= Nicholas U. Mayall Telescope =

Four-meter reflector telescope in Pima County, Arizona

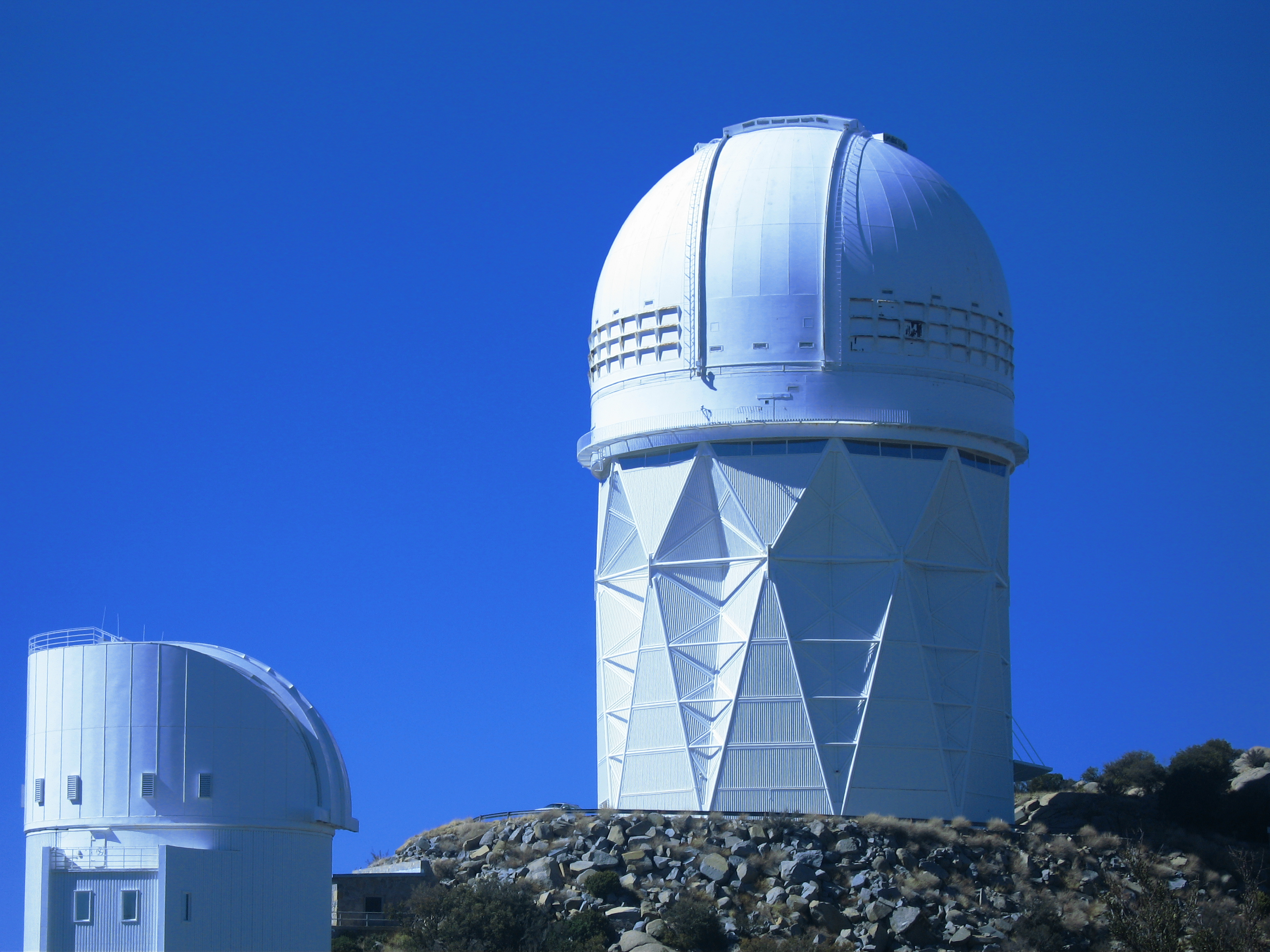
- Alternative names: Mayall 4-meter Telescope
- Location: Arizona
- Coordinates: 31°57′48″N 111°36′00″W
- Altitude: 2,120 m (6,960 ft)
- First light: February 27, 1973
- Discovered: Methane ice on Pluto
- Diameter: 4 m (13 ft 1 in)
- Collecting area: 11.4 m^{2} (123 sq ft)
- Website: noirlab.edu/public/programs/kitt-peak-national-observatory/nicholas-mayall-4m-telescope/
- Location within the United States
- Related media on Commons

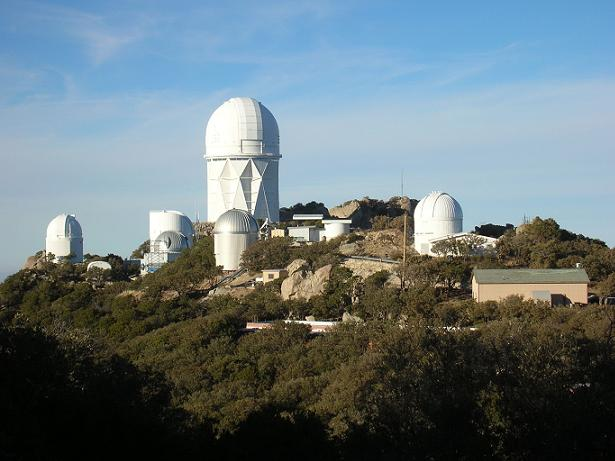
Kitt Peak—Mayall is the tall one

The Nicholas U. Mayall Telescope, also known as the Mayall 4-meter Telescope, is a four-meter (158 inches) reflector telescope located at the Kitt Peak National Observatory in Arizona and named after Nicholas U. Mayall. It saw first light on February 27, 1973, and was the second-largest telescope in the world at that time, between the Hale (5 m) and Shane (3 m). Initial observers included David Crawford, Nicholas Mayall, and Arthur Hoag. It was dedicated on June 20, 1973 after Mayall's retirement as director. The mirror has an f/2.7 hyperboloidal shape. It is made from a two-foot (61 cm (24 in)) thick fused quartz disk that is supported in an advanced-design mirror cell. The prime focus has a 3.2 degree field of view, making it six times larger than that of the Hale reflector. It is host to the Dark Energy Spectroscopic Instrument. The identical Víctor M. Blanco Telescope was later built at Cerro Tololo Inter-American Observatory, in Chile.

== Planning & construction ==
In 1961, after work had moved forward on other telescopes, Mayall proposed an even larger 150-inch mirror telescope for Kitt Peak. Site construction began in 1968 and by 1971 the mirror was delivered to the site. The mirror was made by Owens-Illinois and made of fused quartz, valued for its low coefficient of thermal expansion. The blank was ground at the Kitt Peak optical lab.

The telescope primary mirror is designed to function as the first element in a Ritchey–Chrétien optical design. The telescope was originally designed with three focal point options: the prime focus, a wide-field R/C focus, and a coudé focus.

The telescope was dedicated in the summer of 1973, at which time it was the second largest telescope by aperture in the world. The telescope was named after Mayall who was the director of Kitt Peak National Observatory for over a decade.

== Instruments ==
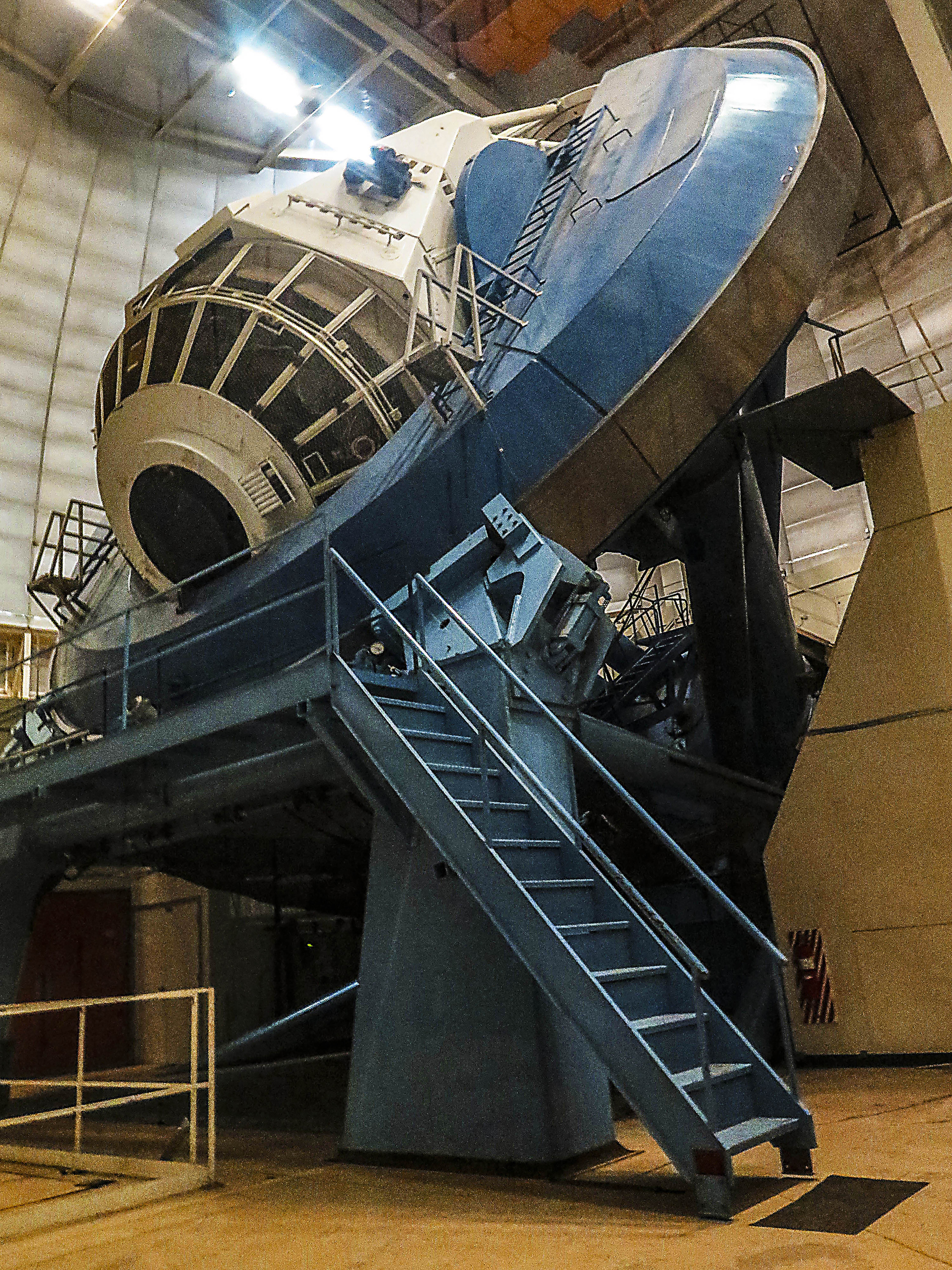
Under the dome

Examples of instruments over its lifetime include various spectrographs, Cryogenic Camera, the Phoenix spectrometer, and the DLIRIM.

The KNPO Mosaic camera was installed in 1998, and was designed for the prime focus. This camera had eight 2048 × 4096 CCD sensors. This led to another camera Mosaic II for the CTIO 4-m telescope in the southern hemisphere.

Mosaic3

Mosaic3 was an imaging camera for the Mayall telescope. This prime focus camera was used for a 3-band survey in support of the upcoming DESI instrument.

Fourier Transform Spectrograph

One instrument used with telescope was the Fourier Transform Spectrograph. The FTS was used between 1975 and 1995, creating an archive of recorded spectra. It was noted for collecting infrared spectrum before the advent of infrared imaging arrays.

Over the time of its operation 10,000 spectra were taken of 800 different astronomical targets, and these were made available in the SpArc data archive in the early 21st century.

DESI

An instrument designed to help understand dark energy, installation of the Dark Energy Spectroscopic Instrument (DESI) was completed in late 2019. Very little is known about dark energy, the supposed pressure responsible for the accelerating expansion rate of the universe.

DESI has five thousand fiber optic sensors, each one being robotically targetable at the focal plane. Planned to examine the nature of millions of galaxies and quasars, the instrument has been a decade in construction and features contributions from hundreds of researchers.

DESI achieved first light in 2019 and completed commissioning in March 2020. Following delays associated with the COVID-19 pandemic, DESI officially began its five-year main survey on 14 May 2021. The originally planned five-year survey was completed on 21 April 2026 after obtaining spectra and redshifts for more than 45 million galaxies and quasars, producing the largest high-resolution three-dimensional map of the universe assembled to that date. Following completion of the primary survey, DESI transitioned into an extended survey program targeting additional regions of the sky and deeper observations of selected fields.

== Discoveries & observations ==
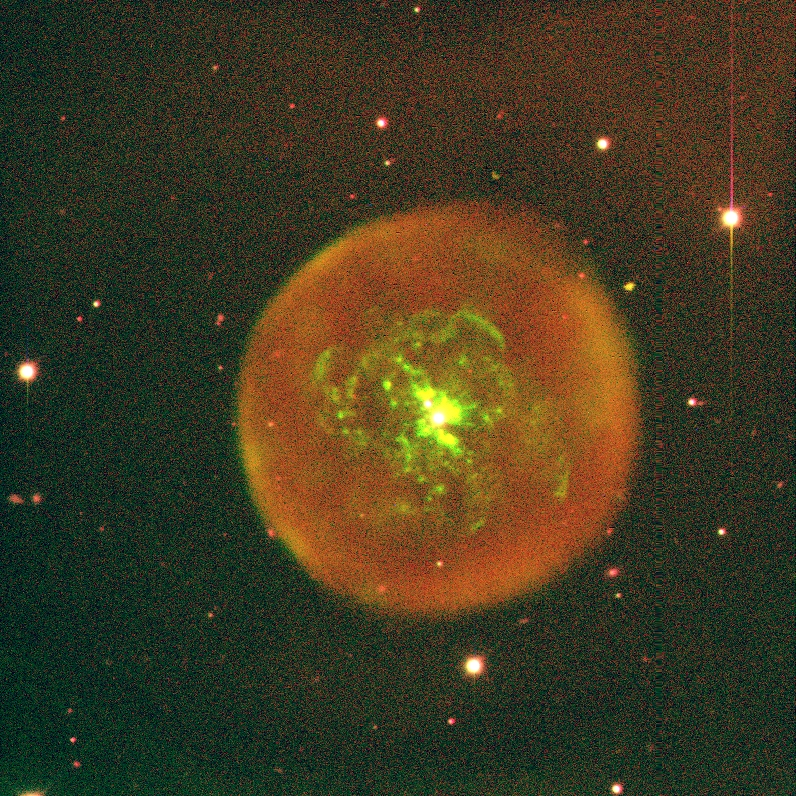
Image of Abell 30 by the Mayall telescope.

In 1976 the Mayall Telescope was used to discover methane ice on Pluto.

The FTS on Mayall was also used to study methane in the outer solar system in the 1980s. The study included observation of monodeutered methane on Titan, a moon of Saturn noted for its thick atmosphere. The Mayall was also one of several large telescopes that was part of a study of the Andromeda galaxy. The observations helped understand the history of that galaxy, which in turn helps understand Earth's galaxy, the Milky Way.

== Gallery ==
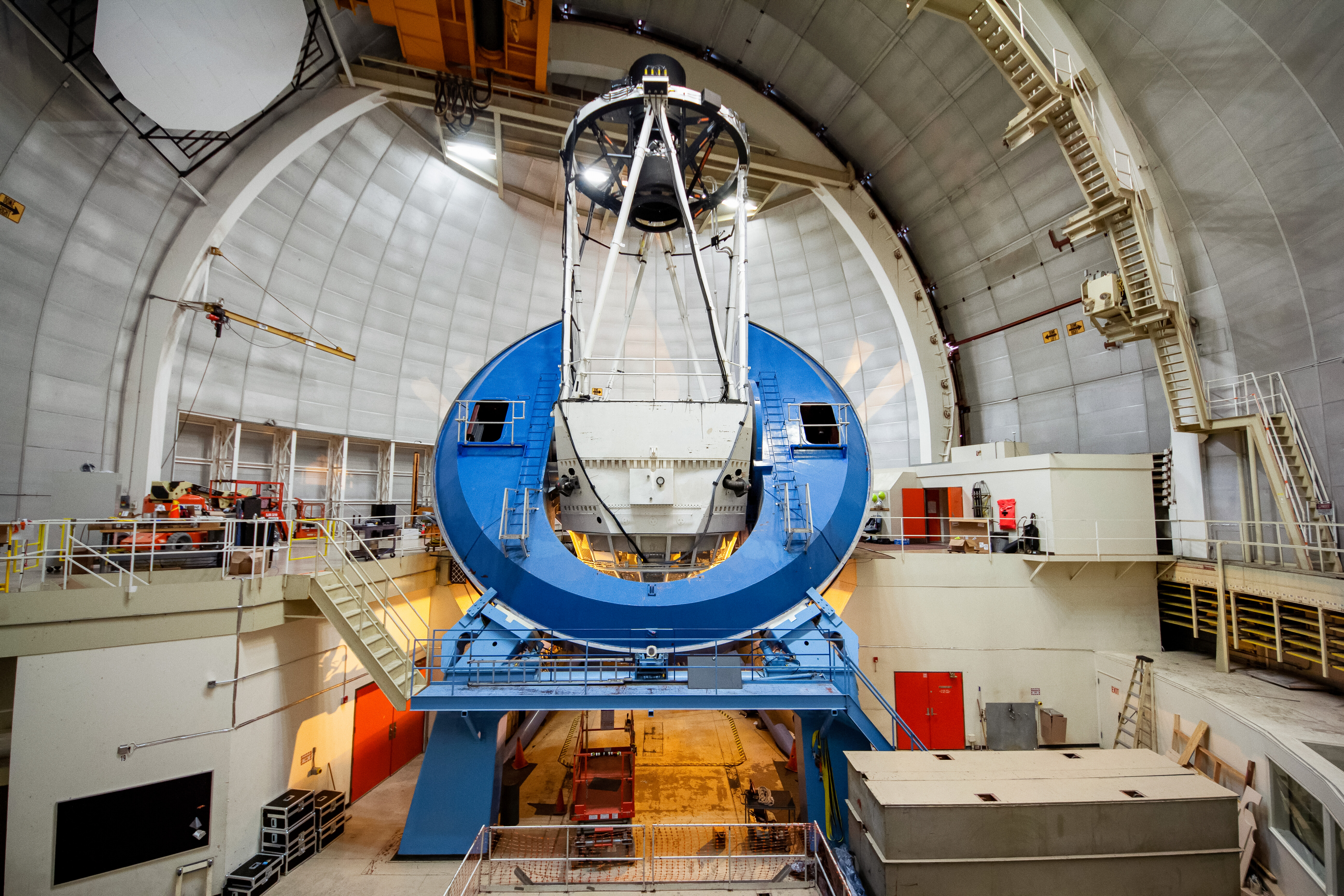
DESI Installed on the Mayall 4-meter Telescope

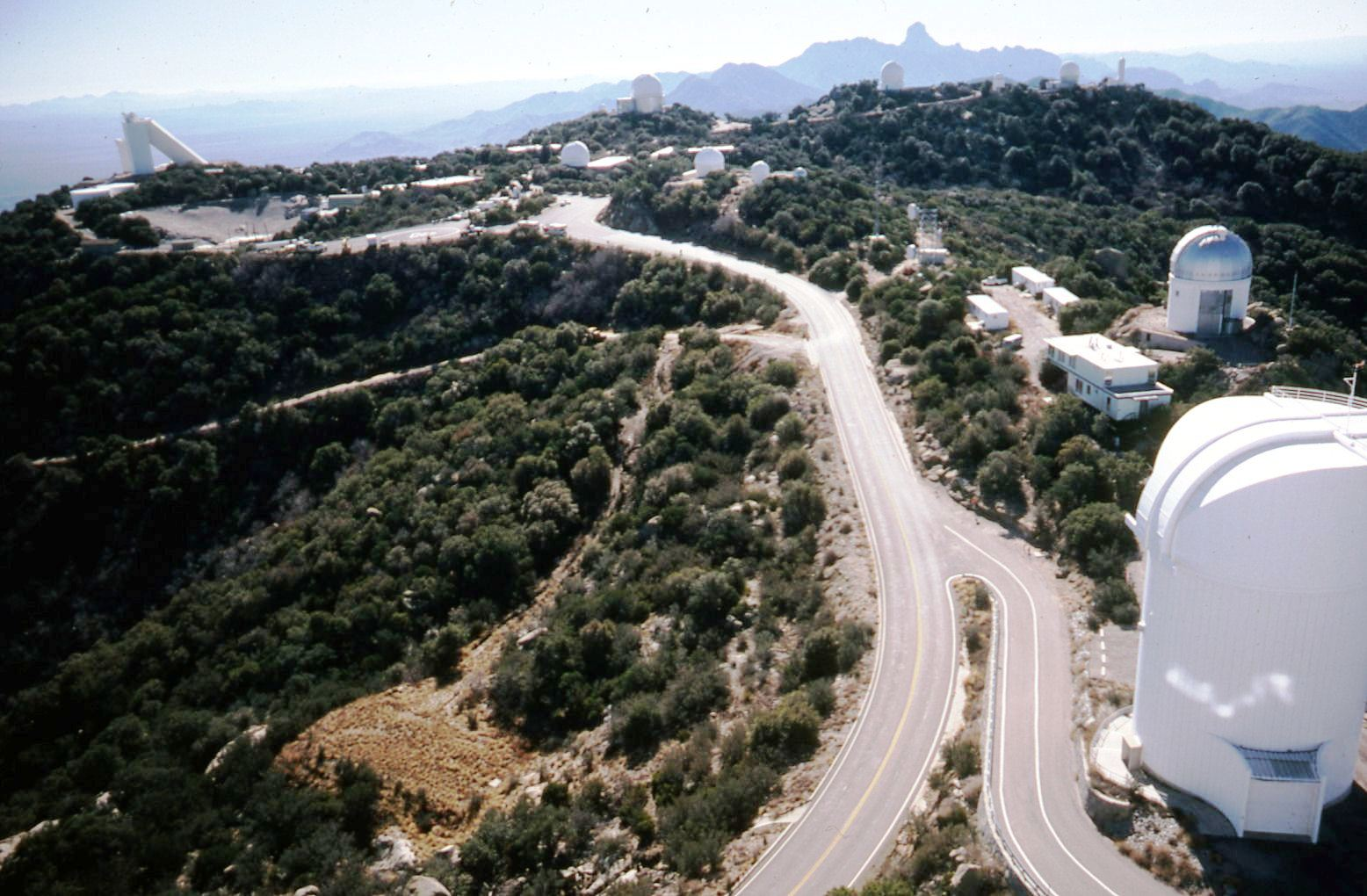
Looking out at Kitt Peak from Mayall

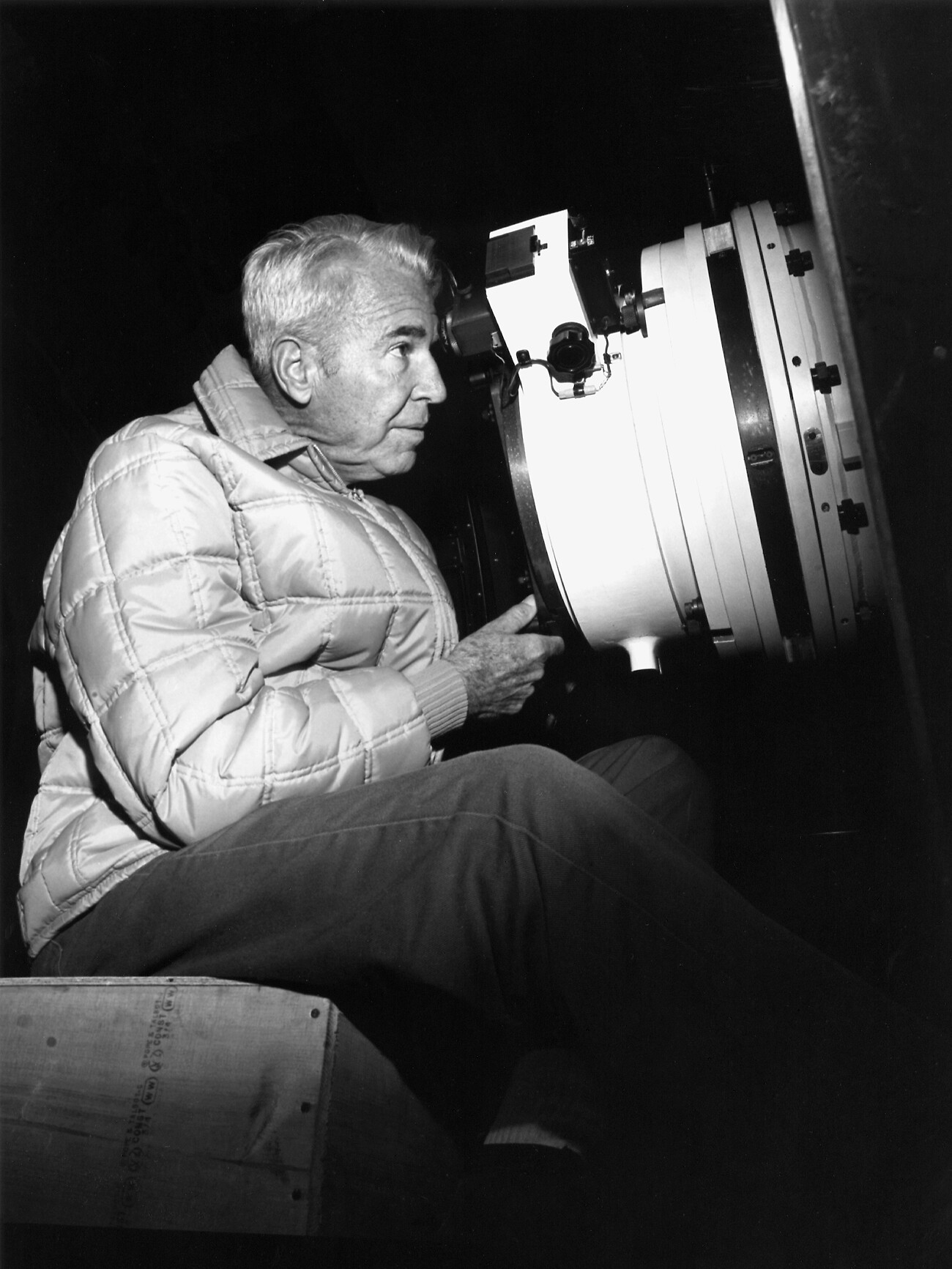
Mayall on March 2, 1973 viewing through the telescope to be named in his honor.

== See also ==
- List of astronomical observatories
- List of largest optical reflecting telescopes
- List of largest optical telescopes in the 20th century
- List of the largest optical telescopes in North America
- Lists of telescopes
