= Bulletin of the American Astronomical Society =

- Discipline: Astronomy
- Language: English

Publication details
- History: 1969–present
- Publisher: American Astronomical Society (United States)
- Frequency: Quarterly

Standard abbreviations
- ISO 4: Bull. Am. Astron. Soc.

Indexing
- ISSN: 0002-7537
- OCLC no.: 1479434

Links
- Journal homepage

Bulletin of the American Astronomical Society (BAAS; Bull. Am. Astron. Soc.) is the journal of record for the American Astronomical Society established in 1969. It publishes meetings of the society, obituaries of its members, and scholarly articles. Four issues are published per year that are collected into a single volume.

Articles are indexed, and often archived, from the Astrophysics Data System, using the journal code BAA.
