= Barbara Ryden =

American astrophysicist

Barbara Sue Ryden
- Education: Northwestern University; Princeton University
- Scientific career
- Workplaces: Ohio State University; Canadian Institute for Theoretical Astrophysics; Center for Astrophysics | Harvard & Smithsonian
- Thesis: Galaxy Formation by Gravitational Collapse in a Universe Dominated by Cold Dark Matter (1987)
- Doctoral advisor: James Gunn

Barbara Sue Ryden is an American astrophysicist who is a Professor of Astronomy at Ohio State University. Her research considers the formation, shape and structure of galaxies. She was elected a fellow of the American Association for the Advancement of Science in 2016.

== Early life and education ==
Ryden studied physics and integrated sciences at Northwestern University. She then went to Princeton University as a doctoral student, where she worked alongside James Gunn as her advisor. She was then a postdoctoral research fellow at the Center for Astrophysics | Harvard & Smithsonian and Canadian Institute for Theoretical Astrophysics.

== Research and career ==
A member of the Ohio State University faculty since 1992, Prof. Ryden studies the formation, alignment, and shapes of galaxies, and the large-scale structure of the universe, and cosmology, including tests for dark energy, dark matter, and the properties of the primordial density fluctuations. She is internationally known for her textbook Introduction to Cosmology, which won the first Chambliss Astronomical Writing Award in 2006 from the American Astronomical Society, and is now in its second edition, and she co-authored Foundations of Astrophysics with Prof. Bradley Peterson, a beginning-level text in astrophysics for astronomy majors. She currently editor in chief of the Ohio State Astrophysics Series, a series of graduate level textbooks now in contract with Cambridge University Press. The first two volumes are Interstellar & Intergalactic Medium by Prof. Ryden and Prof. Richard Pogge (2021) and Stellar Structure & Evolution by Prof. Marc Pinsonneault and Prof. Ryden (2022).

== Awards and honors ==
- 2016 Elected Fellow of the American Association for the Advancement of Science
- 2006 American Astronomical Society Chambliss Astronomical Writing Award for her book Introduction to Cosmology
- 1993-1998 National Science Foundation National Young Investigators Award
- 1990-1991 Summer Program for Young Investigators in Cosmology
- 1986-1987 Jacobus Honorary Fellow, Princeton University
- 1983-1986 National Science Foundation Graduate Fellow
- 1982 Phi Beta Kappa

== Selected publications ==
- Barbara S. Ryden; James E. Gunn (July 1987). "Galaxy formation by gravitational collapse". The Astrophysical Journal. 318: 15. Bibcode:1987ApJ...318...15R. doi:10.1086/165349. ISSN 0004-637X. Wikidata Q105030634.
- William H. Press; Barbara S. Ryden; David N. Spergel (December 1989). "Dynamical evolution of domain walls in an expanding universe". The Astrophysical Journal. 347: 590. Bibcode:1989ApJ...347..590P. doi:10.1086/168151. ISSN 0004-637X. Wikidata Q105030622.
- Press WH; Barbara Ryden; Spergel DN (1 March 1990). "Single mechanism for generating large-scale structure and providing dark missing matter". Physical Review Letters. 64 (10): 1084–1087. Bibcode:1990PhRvL..64.1084P. doi:10.1103/physrevlett.64.1084. ISSN 0031-9007. PMID 10041295. Wikidata Q74499882.
- Unterborn, C. T., & Ryden, B. S. (2008). "Inclination‐dependent extinction effects in disk galaxies in the sloan digital sky survey". The Astrophysical Journal, 687(2), 976–985. https://doi.org/10.1086/591898

=== Books ===
- Introduction to Cosmology. Barbara Ryden, 2003, San Francisco: Addison Wesley. ISBN 978-0-8053-8912-8
- Uchuron Nyumon. Barbara Ryden, 2003, translated by Nobuyoshi Makino. Tokyo: Pearson Education Japan. ISBN 978-4-89471-443-4
- Foundations of Astrophysics. Barbara Ryden & Bradley M. Peterson, 2010, San Francisco: Addison Wesley. ISBN 978-0-321-59558-4
- Foundations of Astrophysics, International Edition. Barbara Ryden & Bradley M. Peterson, 2011, Upper Saddle River, NJ: Pearson Education. ISBN 978-0-321-74805-8
- Introduction to Cosmology, International Edition. Barbara Ryden, 2014, Harlow, Essex, England: Pearson Education Limited. ISBN 978-1-292-03971-8
- Interstellar and Intergalactic Medium [eBook]. Barbara Ryden & Richard Pogge, 2015, The Ohio State University. ISBN 978-1-941602-02-7
- Dynamics [eBook]. Barbara Ryden, 2016, The Ohio State University. ISBN 978-1-941602-04-1
- Introduction to Cosmology, Second Edition. Barbara Ryden, 2017, Cambridge, England: Cambridge University Press. ISBN 978-1-107-15483-4
- Introduction to Cosmology, Chinese Edition. Barbara Ryden, 2019, Beijing: Peking University Press. ISBN 978-7-301-30788-5
- Foundations of Astrophysics [reprint]. Barbara Ryden & Bradley M. Peterson, 2021, Cambridge, England: Cambridge University Press. ISBN 978-1-108-83195-6
- Interstellar and Intergalactic Medium. Barbara Ryden & Richard Pogge, 2021, Cambridge, England: Cambridge University Press. ISBN 978-1-108-74877-3
- Uchuron Nyumon, Second Edition. Barbara Ryden, 2022, translated by Nobuyoshi Makino. Tokyo: Morikita Publishing. ISBN 978-4-627-15762-0
- Stellar Structure and Evolution. Marc Pinsonneault & Barbara Ryden, 2023, Cambridge, England: Cambridge University Press. ISBN 978-1-108-79882-2
- Celestial and Stellar Dynamics. Barbara Ryden, 2025, Cambridge, England: Cambridge University Press ISBN 978-1-108-81901-5
- Astrophysical Gas Dynamics. Barbara Ryden, 2026, Cambridge, England: Cambridge University Press, in preparation. ISBN 978-1-108-81915-2
