= J. Craig Wheeler =

American astronomer

John Craig Wheeler (born 1943) is an American astronomer. He is the Samuel T. and Fern Yanagisawa Regents Professor of Astronomy Emeritus at the University of Texas at Austin. He is known for his theoretical work on supernovae. He is a past president of the American Astronomical Society, a Fellow of that society, and a Fellow of the American Physical Society.

== Early life and education ==
Wheeler graduated from the Massachusetts Institute of Technology in 1965 with a Bachelor of Science in physics. He was awarded his PhD in physics in 1969 from the University of Colorado Boulder. He then held a postdoctoral fellowship at the California Institute of Technology until 1971.

== Career ==
In 1971 Wheeler became an assistant professor in the Department of Astronomy at Harvard University. In 1974 he joined the Department of Astronomy at the University of Texas at Austin. He became the Samuel T. and Fern Yanagisawa Regents Professor of Astronomy in 1985.

Wheeler served as the President of the American Astronomical Society (AAS) from 2006 to 2008. He was elected a Fellow of the American Physical Society in 2007. In 2008, he became a Legacy Fellow of the AAS.

Based on the "Astronomy Bizarre" course he taught for non-majors, Wheeler published Cosmic Catastrophes: Supernovae, Gamma-ray Bursts, and Adventures in Hyperspace in 2000. The second edition, Cosmic Catastrophes: Exploding Stars, Black Holes, and Mapping the Universe, was published in 2007. In 2019 he and David Branch received the Chambliss Astronomical Writing Award for their textbook Supernova Explosions.

== Awards and honors ==
- 2007 Fellow of the American Physical Society
- 2008 Legacy Fellow of the American Astronomical Society
- 2019 Chambliss Astronomical Writing Award

== Selected publications ==
=== Articles ===
- Wheeler, J. Craig; Sneden, Christopher (1989). "Abundance Ratios as a Function of Metallicity". Annual Review of Astronomy and Astrophysics. 27 (1): 279–349. Bibcode:1989ARA&A..27..279W. doi:10.1146/annurev.aa.27.090189.001431. ISSN 0066-4146.
- Wheeler, J C; Harkness, R P (1990). "Type I supernovae". Reports on Progress in Physics. 53 (12): 1467–1557. Bibcode:1990RPPh...53.1467W. doi:10.1088/0034-4885/53/12/001. ISSN 0034-4885. S2CID 250904965.
- Wheeler, J. Craig; Yi, Insu; Hoflich, Peter; Wang, Lifan (2000). "Asymmetric Supernovae, Pulsars, Magnetars, and Gamma-Ray Bursts". The Astrophysical Journal. 537 (2): 810–823. arXiv:astro-ph/9909293. Bibcode:2000ApJ...537..810W. doi:10.1086/309055. ISSN 0004-637X. S2CID 40437912.
- Wang, Lifan; Howell, D. Andrew; Hoflich, Peter; Wheeler, J. Craig (2001). "Bipolar Supernova Explosions". The Astrophysical Journal. 550 (2): 1030–1035. arXiv:astro-ph/9912033. Bibcode:2001ApJ...550.1030W. doi:10.1086/319822. ISSN 0004-637X. S2CID 123003052.
- Wheeler, J. Craig; Meier, David L.; Wilson, James R. (2002). "Asymmetric Supernovae from Magnetocentrifugal Jets". The Astrophysical Journal. 568 (2): 807–819. arXiv:astro-ph/0112020. Bibcode:2002ApJ...568..807W. doi:10.1086/338953. ISSN 0004-637X. S2CID 118997409.
- Akiyama, Shizuka; Wheeler, J. Craig; Meier, David L.; Lichtenstadt, Itamar (2003). "The Magnetorotational Instability in Core-Collapse Supernova Explosions". The Astrophysical Journal. 584 (2): 954–970. arXiv:astro-ph/0208128. Bibcode:2003ApJ...584..954A. doi:10.1086/344135. ISSN 0004-637X. S2CID 14720534.
- Wang, Lifan; Wheeler, J. Craig (2008). "Spectropolarimetry of Supernovae". Annual Review of Astronomy and Astrophysics. 46 (1): 433–474. arXiv:0811.1054. Bibcode:2008ARA&A..46..433W. doi:10.1146/annurev.astro.46.060407.145139. ISSN 0066-4146. S2CID 14259601.
- Wheeler, J. Craig (2012). "Astrophysical explosions: from solar flares to cosmic gamma-ray bursts". Philosophical Transactions of the Royal Society A: Mathematical, Physical and Engineering Sciences. 370 (1960): 774–799. arXiv:1111.5584. Bibcode:2012RSPTA.370..774W. doi:10.1098/rsta.2011.0351. ISSN 1364-503X. PMID 22213668. S2CID 1090392.

=== Books ===
- Wheeler, J.C., ed. (1993). Accretion Disks In Compact Stellar Systems. Advanced Series In Astrophysics And Cosmology. World Scientific Publishing Company. ISBN 978-981-4504-59-1.
- Wheeler, J.C. (2007) [1st ed. 2000]. Cosmic Catastrophes: Exploding Stars, Black Holes, and Mapping the Universe (2nd ed.). Cambridge University Press. ISBN 978-0-521-85714-7.
- Branch, D.; Wheeler, J.C. (2017). Supernova Explosions. Astronomy and Astrophysics Library. Springer Berlin Heidelberg. ISBN 978-3-662-55054-0.

=== Science fiction ===
- Wheeler, J. Craig (1986). The Krone Experiment. Pressworks Publishing. ISBN 0-939722-21-6.
- Wheeler, J. Craig (2011). Krone Ascending. Independently published. ISBN 979-8786848800.
- Wheeler, J. Craig (2016). "Betelgeuse". In Brotherton, M. (ed.). Science Fiction by Scientists: An Anthology of Short Stories. Science and Fiction. Springer International Publishing. pp. 95=104. ISBN 978-3-319-41102-6.
