= American Astronomical Society =

American professional organization of astronomers

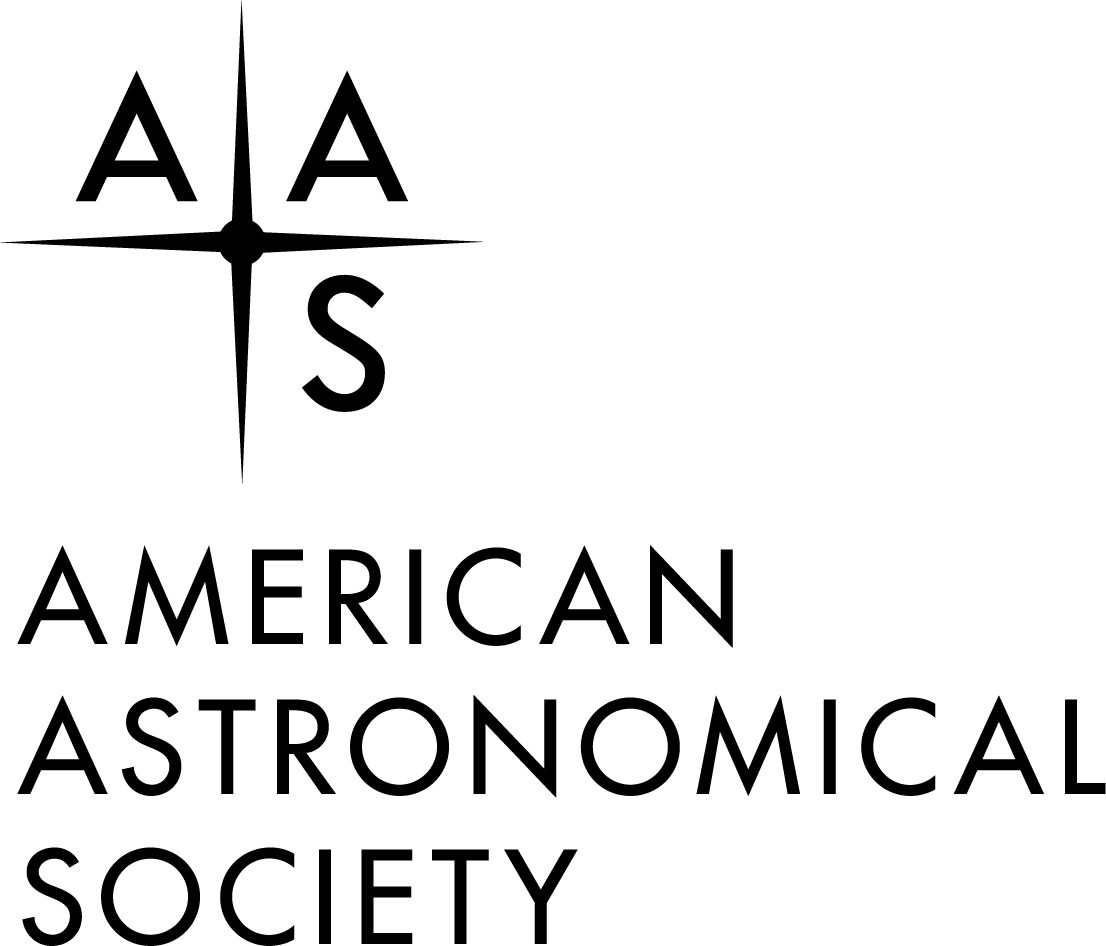
- Formation: 1899; 127 years ago
- Type: Non-governmental organization
- Purpose: The advancement of astronomy and closely related branches of science.
- Headquarters: Washington, D.C.
- Coordinates: 38°54′11″N 77°02′18″W
- Members: 7,000
- President: Dara Norman
- Website: aas.org
- Formerly called: Astronomical and Astrophysical Society of America

The American Astronomical Society (AAS) is an American professional society of astronomers and other interested individuals. Its primary objective is to promote the advancement of astronomy and closely related branches of science, while the secondary purpose includes enhancing astronomy education and providing a political voice for its members through lobbying and grassroots activities. Its current mission is to enhance and share humanity's scientific understanding of the universe as a diverse and inclusive astronomical community.

== History ==
The society was founded in 1899 through the efforts of George Ellery Hale. The constitution of the group was written by Hale, George Comstock, Edward Morley, Simon Newcomb and Edward Charles Pickering. These men, plus four others, were the first Executive Council of the society; Newcomb was the first president. The initial membership was 114. The AAS name of the society was not finally decided until 1915, previously it was the "Astronomical and Astrophysical Society of America". One proposed name that preceded this interim name was "American Astrophysical Society".

The AAS today has over 8,000 members and six divisions – the Division for Planetary Sciences (1968), the Division on Dynamical Astronomy (1969), the High Energy Astrophysics Division (1969), the Solar Physics Division (1969), the Historical Astronomy Division (1980) and the Laboratory Astrophysics Division (2012). The membership includes physicists, mathematicians, geologists, engineers and others whose research interests lie within the broad spectrum of subjects now comprising contemporary astronomy. The annual meeting of the AAS is held in the spring and constitutes the largest gathering of astronomers, numbering over 3,000 in 2023.

In 2019 three AAS members were selected into the tenth anniversary class of TED Fellows.

The AAS established the AAS Fellows program in 2019 to "confer recognition upon AAS members for achievement and extraordinary service to the field of astronomy and the American Astronomical Society." The inaugural class was designated by the AAS Board of Trustees and includes an initial group of 232 Legacy Fellows.

In January 2025, AAS published a statement calling on nations to ban advertising from space that can be seen from the ground amid growing concern around the launch obtrusive space advertising payloads.

== Membership ==
The AAS is the major organization of professional astronomers in North America. The membership includes physicists, mathematicians, geologists, engineers and others whose research interests lie within the broad spectrum of subjects comprising contemporary astronomy.

The society offers several classes of membership and affiliation. Full Members must meet at least two of three criteria: possessing a graduate degree in astronomy or a related science, receiving the nomination of a current Full Member, or having placed a refereed publication in a recognised international journal. Until 2018, admission as a Full Member required nomination by two existing Full Members; that year the society restructured its membership classes, broadening eligibility to include holders of master's degrees and introducing new affiliate categories. Other membership classes include Graduate Student Members, Undergraduate Student Members (also open to high-school students), International Affiliates for astronomers residing outside the United States, Amateur Affiliates, and Alumni Affiliates for former members who have left the field.

As of 2025, the AAS has approximately 8,200 members across all categories. The society is a member society of the American Institute of Physics.

=== Fellows ===
The AAS established its Fellows program in 2019 to recognise members for achievement and extraordinary service to the field of astronomy and the society. The inaugural class, designated by the AAS Board of Trustees, included 232 Legacy Fellows. New fellows are elected annually thereafter.

== Divisions ==
Because the field of astronomy is diverse, several divisions have been formed each of which promotes and enables a different branch of astronomy or astronomy-related science as well as working within the overall charter of the AAS. Many of the divisions hold separate meetings in addition to meeting with the main group. The divisions of the AAS, together with their main research interests, are:

- The Division for Planetary Sciences (DPS) supports planetology and exploration of the Solar System.
- The Division on Dynamical Astronomy (DDA) supports research on the dynamics (orbits, evolution, and history) of astronomical systems from the Solar System to superclusters of galaxies on cosmological scales.
- The High Energy Astrophysics Division (HEAD) supports knowledge about high energy events, particles, quanta, relativistic gravitational fields, and related phenomena in the astrophysical universe.
- The Historical Astronomy Division (HAD) supports topics relevant to the history of astronomy as a field, and research using historical astronomical records to solve current problems in astronomy.
- The Solar Physics Division (SPD) supports solar physics (astrophysical research on the Sun), and its interactions with the Solar System and Earth.
- In 2012, a new division was formed: the Laboratory Astrophysics Division (LAD) to advance humanity's understanding of the Universe through the promotion of fundamental theoretical and experimental research into the underlying processes that drive the Universe.

== Publications ==
- Astronomical Journal
- Astronomy Education Review [no longer published]
- The Astrophysical Journal
- The Planetary Science Journal
- Bulletin of the American Astronomical Society
- Research Notes of the AAS (scientific publication of brief communications, non peer-reviewed)
- AAS Nova, an online publication with highlights from the research journals of the Society.
- In June 2019 AAS announced that it would be the new publisher of Sky & Telescope.
- In August 2020 AAS announced that it had acquired the inventory, author contracts and related assets of Willmann-Bell, Inc. a publisher of astronomical books, atlases and software.

== Prizes ==
- The Henry Norris Russell Lectureship, for lifetime achievement in astronomy
- The Newton Lacy Pierce Prize in Astronomy, for outstanding early career in observational astronomy
- The Helen B. Warner Prize for Astronomy, for outstanding early career in theoretical astronomy
- The Beatrice M. Tinsley Prize, for a creative or innovating contribution to astronomy
- The Joseph Weber Award, for a significant advance in astronomical instrumentation
- The Dannie Heineman Prize for Astrophysics (joint award with the American Institute of Physics), for outstanding work in astrophysics
- The George Van Biesbroeck Prize, for outstanding service to astronomy
- The Annie J. Cannon Award in Astronomy (awarded in concert with the American Association of University Women), for outstanding early career by a female astronomer
- The Chambliss Astronomical Writing Award for astronomy writing for an academic audience
- The Beth Brown Memorial Award for exemplary poster and oral research presentation by undergraduate and graduate students
- The Chambliss Astronomy Achievement Student Award for exemplary research by undergraduate and graduate students
- The Chambliss Amateur Achievement Award for exemplary research by an amateur astronomer
- The AAS Education Prize for outstanding contributions to astronomy education (formerly called the Annenberg Foundation Award)

Similar prizes are awarded by AAS divisions. These include:

- The Gerard P. Kuiper Prize (DPS), for lifetime achievement in planetary science
- The Harold C. Urey Prize (DPS), for outstanding early career in planetary science
- The Harold Masursky Meritorious Service Award (DPS), for outstanding service to planetary science
- The Brouwer Award (DDA), for lifetime achievement in dynamical astronomy
- The Bruno Rossi Prize (HEAD), for a significant recent contribution to high-energy astrophysics
- The LeRoy E. Doggett Prize (HAD), for work in the history of astronomy
- The George Ellery Hale Prize (SPD), for lifetime achievement in solar astronomy
- The Karen Harvey Prize (SPD), for outstanding early career in solar astronomy

The AAS also manages an International Travel Grant program, which any astronomer working in the US may apply to for travel to international astronomy-related conferences and other smaller grant and award programs. American Astronomical Society won the 2020 Webby People's Voice Award for Association in the category Web.

== Past presidents ==
The following past and present members served as president of the society during the listed periods:

- Simon Newcomb (1899–1905)
- Edward Charles Pickering (1905–1919)
- Frank Schlesinger (1919–1922)
- William Wallace Campbell (1922–1925)
- George Cary Comstock (1925–1928)
- Ernest William Brown (1928–1931)
- Walter Sydney Adams (1931–1934)
- Henry Norris Russell (1934–1937)
- Robert Grant Aitken (1937–1940)
- Joel Stebbins (1940–1943)
- Harlow Shapley (1943–1946)
- Otto Struve (1946–1949)
- Alfred Harrison Joy (1949–1952)
- Robert Raynolds McMath (1952–1954)
- Donald Howard Menzel (1954–1956)
- Paul Willard Merrill (1956–1958)
- Gerald Maurice Clemence (1958–1960)
- Lyman Spitzer Jr. (1960–1962)
- Carlyle Smith Beals (1962–1964)
- Leo Goldberg (1964–1966)
- Bengt Strömgren (1966–1967)
- Albert E. Whitford (1967–1970)
- Martin Schwarzschild (1970–1972)
- Bart J. Bok (1972–1974)
- Robert Paul Kraft (1974–1976)
- E. Margaret Burbidge (1976–1978)
- Ivan R. King (1978–1980)
- David S. Heeschen (1980–1982)
- Arthur D. Code (1982–1984)
- Maarten Schmidt (1984–1986)
- Bernard F. Burke (1986–1988)
- Donald Edward Osterbrock (1988–1990)
- John Norris Bahcall (1990–1992)
- Sidney C. Wolff (1992–1994)
- Frank Shu (1994–1996)
- Andrea K. Dupree (1996–1998)
- Robert D. Gehrz (1998–2000)
- Anneila I. Sargent (2000–2002)
- Catherine A. Pilachowski (2002–2004)
- Robert P. Kirshner (2004–2006)
- J. Craig Wheeler (2006–2008)
- John Peter Huchra (2008–2010)
- Debra M. Elmegreen (2010–2012)
- David Helfand (2012–2014)
- Meg Urry (2014–2016)
- Christine Jones-Foreman (2016–2018)
- Megan Donahue (2018–2020)
- Paula Szkody (2020–2022)
- Kelsey Johnson (2022-2024)
- Dara Norman (2024-2026)

== See also ==
- List of astronomical societies
