= Abell 30 =

Planetary nebula in the constellation of Cancer

Emission nebula
- Planetary nebula
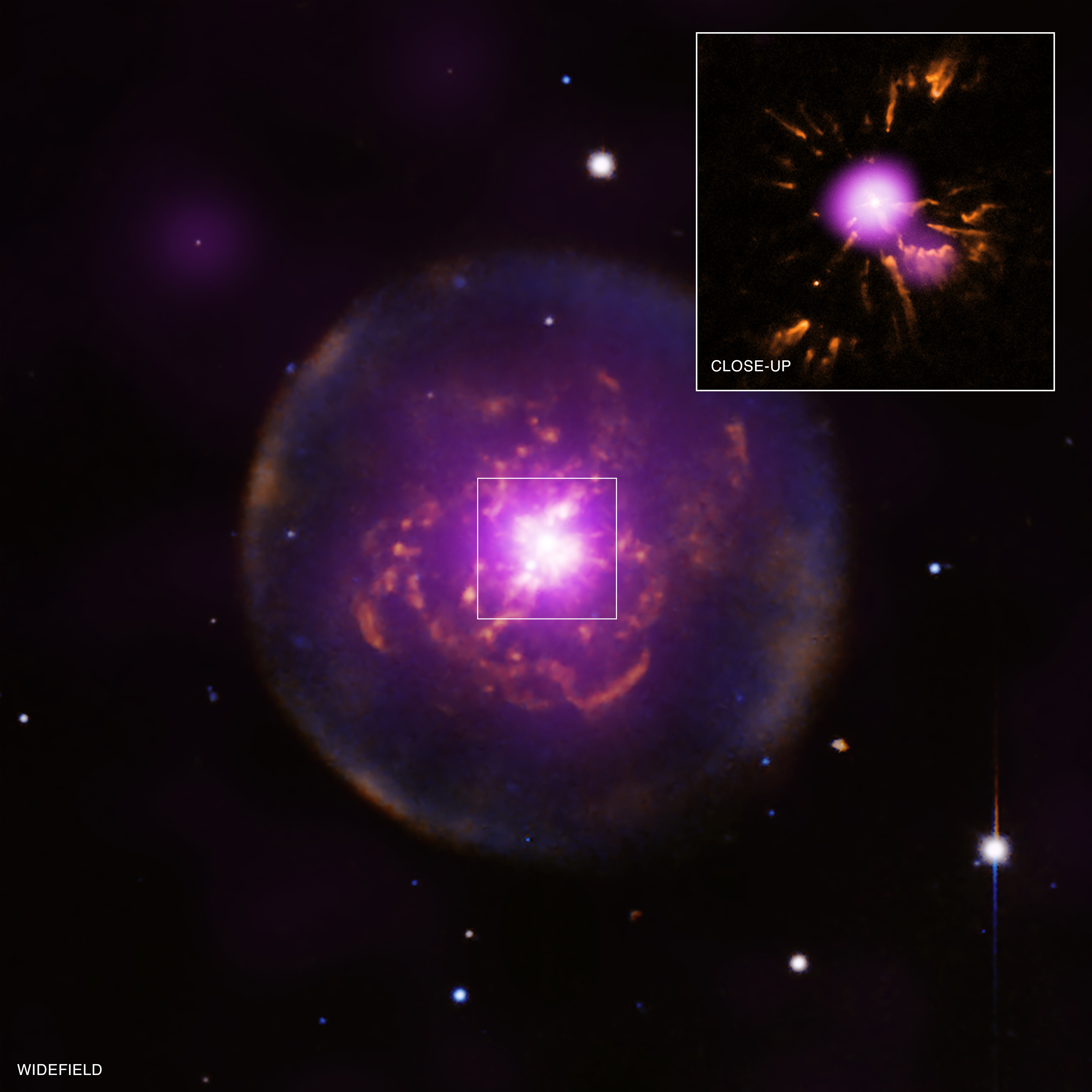
- Composite image of Abell 30 in optical light and X-rays

Observation data: J2000.0 epoch
- Right ascension: 08^{h} 46^{m} 53^{s}
- Declination: 17° 52′ 46″
- Distance: 5,500 ly
- Apparent magnitude (V): 14.3
- Apparent dimensions (V): 0.29′ × 0.13′
- Constellation: Cancer
- Notable features: born-again nebula
- Designations: PK 208+33 1, Abell 30, IRAS F08440+1803, GALEX J084653.4+175248, 2MASS J08465346+1752463

Abell 30 is a planetary nebula located in the constellation of Cancer, at a distance of 5,500 light years. It belongs in the rare category of born-again planetary nebulae, in which stellar activity started up again after the creation of the planetary nebula.

== History ==
The planetary nebula was discovered by George O. Abell in photographic plates obtained during the Palomar Sky Survey. The discovery was published in 1966 in a list of 86 of old faint planetary nebulae known as the Abell Catalog of Planetary Nebulae. In 1979 it was found that the centre of the Abell 30, as well as Abell 78, was noticeably hotter and brighter than the rest of the nebula and features knots which were not visible in H-alpha. The mechanism that lead to the creation of the central knots was descripted in 1983.

== Formation ==
A planetary nebula is formed in the late stage of the evolution of a sun-like star. After having steadily produced energy for several billion years through the nuclear fusion of hydrogen into helium in its central region, or core, the star undergoes a series of energy crises related to the depletion of hydrogen and subsequent contraction of the core. These crises culminate in the star expanding a hundred-fold to become a red giant.

Eventually the outer envelope of the red giant is ejected and moves away from the star at a relatively sedate speed of less than 100,000 miles per hour. The star meanwhile is transformed from a cool giant into a hot, compact star known as a white dwarf that produces intense ultraviolet radiation and a fast wind of particles moving at about 6 million miles per hour. The interaction of the UV radiation and the fast wind with the ejected red giant envelope creates the planetary nebula, creating a large spherical shell. The outer shell has an observed age of 12,500 years.

In rare cases, the helium shell of the star reaches critical mass and fuses into carbon and oxygen in the region surrounding the star’s core and heats the outer envelope of the star so much that it temporarily becomes a red giant again, in what is known as a very late thermal pulse. The sequence of events – envelope ejection followed by a fast stellar wind – is repeated on a much faster scale than before, and a small-scale planetary nebula is created inside the original one. In a sense, the planetary nebula is reborn. This new activity created the knots in the inner part of the nebula. The expansion rate of the knots when observed by Hubble Space Telescope across a time span of 20 years indicates they have an age of 610 to 950 years.

== Morphology ==
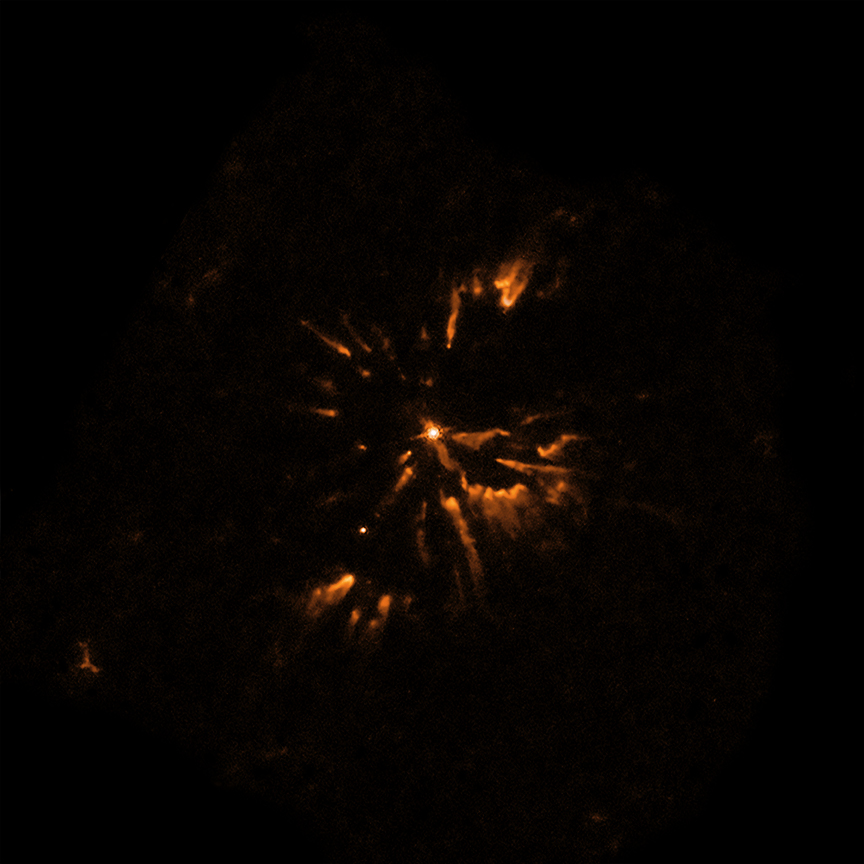
The knots in the centre of Abell 30 by Hubble Space Telescope.

Abell 30 consists of an outer shell, a faint cloverleaf pattern, and a central star that is surrounded by knots. The outer shell has a radius of 63 arcseconds and brightens gradually up to a sharp edge. The cloverleaf pattern is more pronounced towards the southeast and southwest and reaches 26 arcseconds from the centre, almost half away to the edge.

The brightest knots lie within 10 arcseconds from the central star. Although originally four knots were identified, named J1 to J4, higher resolution images of the images revealed that they were composed of smaller knots and filaments. These smaller knots are cometary in appearance, with a length of several arcseconds and a width of less than half an arcsecond. The nebula has two bright polar knots, lying about seven arcseconds from the central star, and both feature a bow shock towards the central star. The other knots are arranged in a disk like the spokes of a wheel seen at an inclination of 60 degrees. To the southwest, where the bright knots are located, the knots form a fan.

The infrared morphology of the nebula is quite different. It features smooth disk-like emission extending along a northeast to southwest axis, passing through the central star and knot J4, while no enhancement is seen at knots J1 and J3. Along the axis also lie the brightest parts of the outer shell of the nebula. The X-ray emission of the nebula consists of a point source at the central star and diffuse emission associated with the knots and the cloverleaf structure. The diffuse emission is possibly the result of the material in the knots getting hit by the fast stellar wind and heated into plasma.

The central star of the planetary nebula has been found to have a spectral type between a carbon rich Wolf–Rayet star and a PG 1159 star, and is categorised as a [WC]-PG 1159 star. Its temperature is estimated to be 110,000 K. The star appears to be variable, with a period of 1.06 days. It is possible that the presence of a colder and dimmer companion is the source of the variability observed.

== Composition ==
The central region of the nebula is notably depleted in hydrogen when observed in H-alpha emission and the knots appear to be rich in helium and lack hydrogen emission. More over, the composition of the knots isn't uniform. The abundance of helium indicates that all the hydrogen has been converted to helium. Also, oxygen, nitrogen and neon were detected in expected quantities, while carbon abundances were elevated. When the high abundance of carbon in the knot J3 was detected, derived by the λ4267 line, it was questioned. However the high abundance of carbon was also observed in the ultraviolet spectrum of the nebula.

A more detailed spectral analysis confirmed the chemical segregation of the knots. The polar knots (J1 and J3) have higher helium to hydrogen ratio, with 7 times more helium than hydrogen, than the other knots, where the He/H ratio is about 4. Also the abundances of oxygen and nitrogen in the polar knots is about an order of magnitude lower than those observed in planetary nebula while neon is about three times less. Contrary, knot 4 has the expected abundances of oxygen and nitrogen. The oxygen recombination lines indicate that the polar knots have cool, yet ionised carbon, oxygen and nitrogen in their core. The temperatures calculated from the oxygen recombination lines are 500 K for J1 and 2500 K for J3.

Around the central star carbon dust has been discovered in the infrared, lying at the same location with the knots. The total dust mass is estimated to be 3.20+3.21
−2.06×10^{−3} M_{☉}. Accounting for the carbon embedding in the dust, there is more carbon than oxygen in the ejecta of the nebula, favoring the very late thermal pulse model. The carbon dust is expected to destroyed around the central star and be pushed away by radiation pressure.

== See also ==
- Abell 78 - a similar planetary nebula
- V605 Aquilae - the central star of Abell 58, that underwent a very late thermal pulse
- Sakurai's Object - a star in a faint planetary nebula undergoing a very late thermal pulse
