= National Optical Astronomy Observatory =

United States national observatory

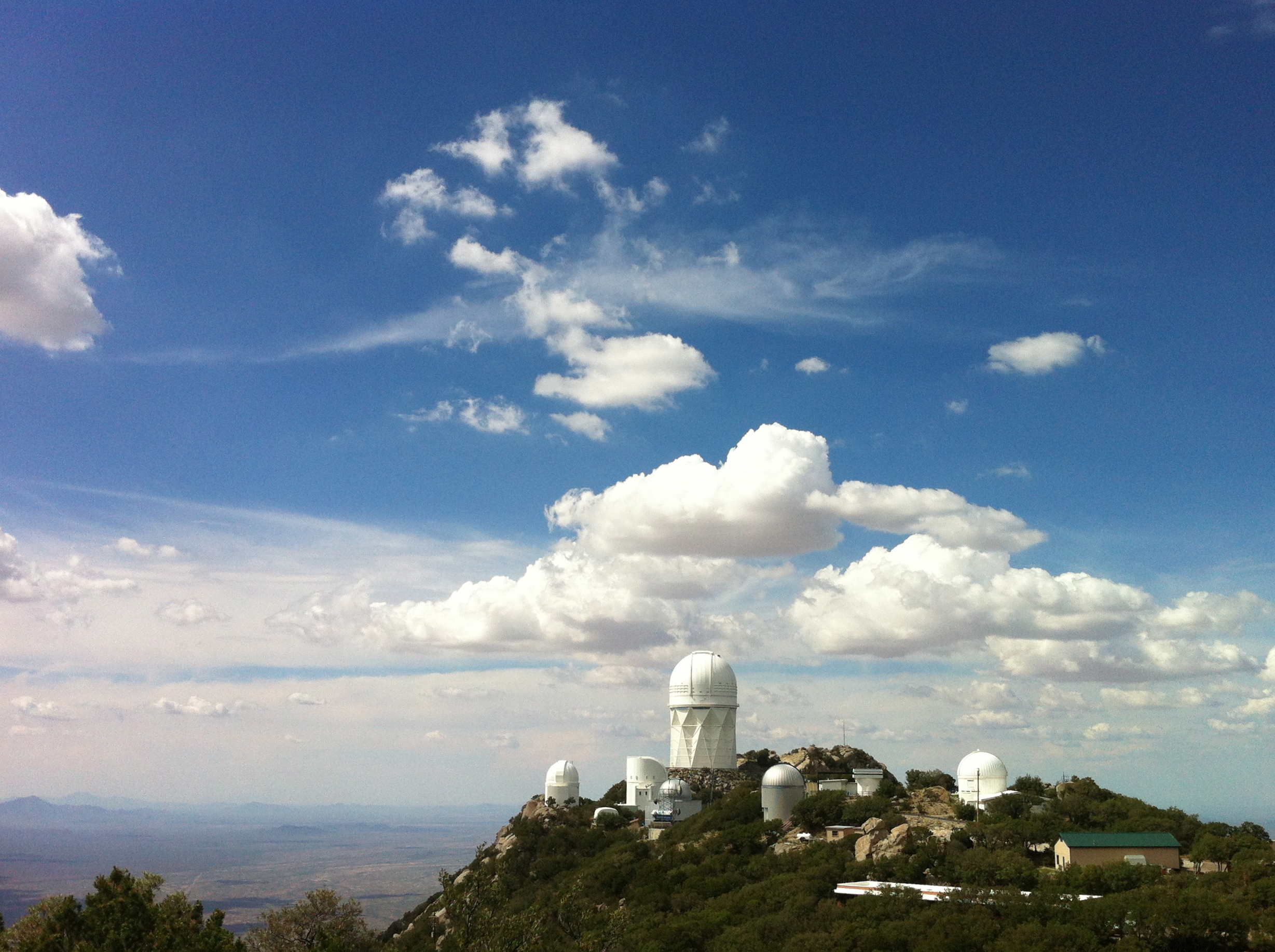

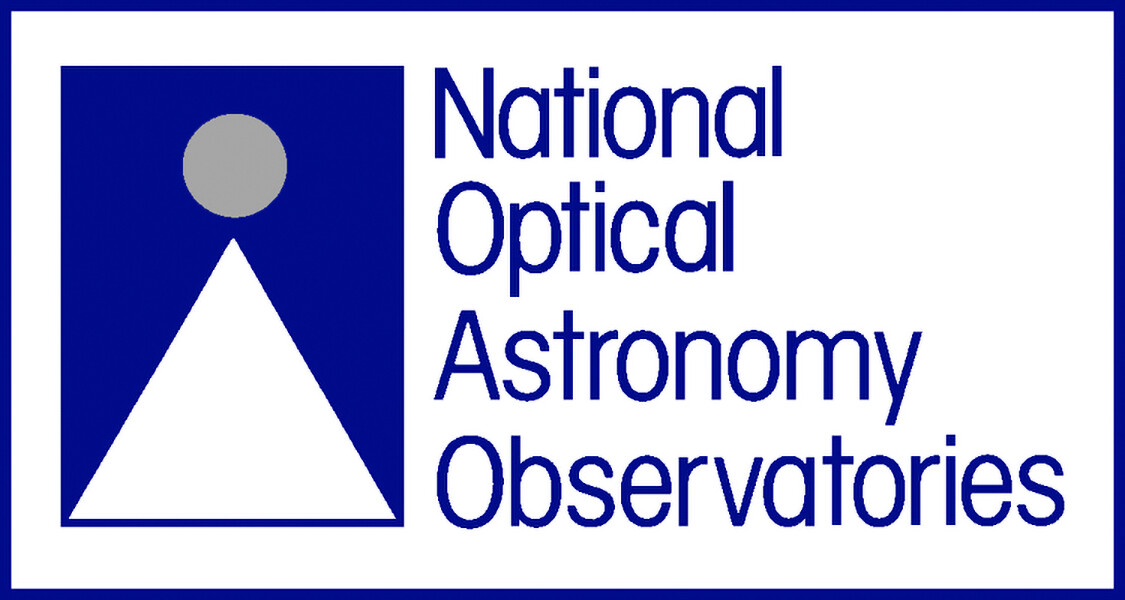
- Alternative names: NOAO
- Organization: National Science Foundation, AURA
- Location: Tucson, Pima County, Arizona
- Established: 1984
- Closed: 2019
- Website: https://legacy.noirlab.edu/about-noao.php
- Related media on Commons

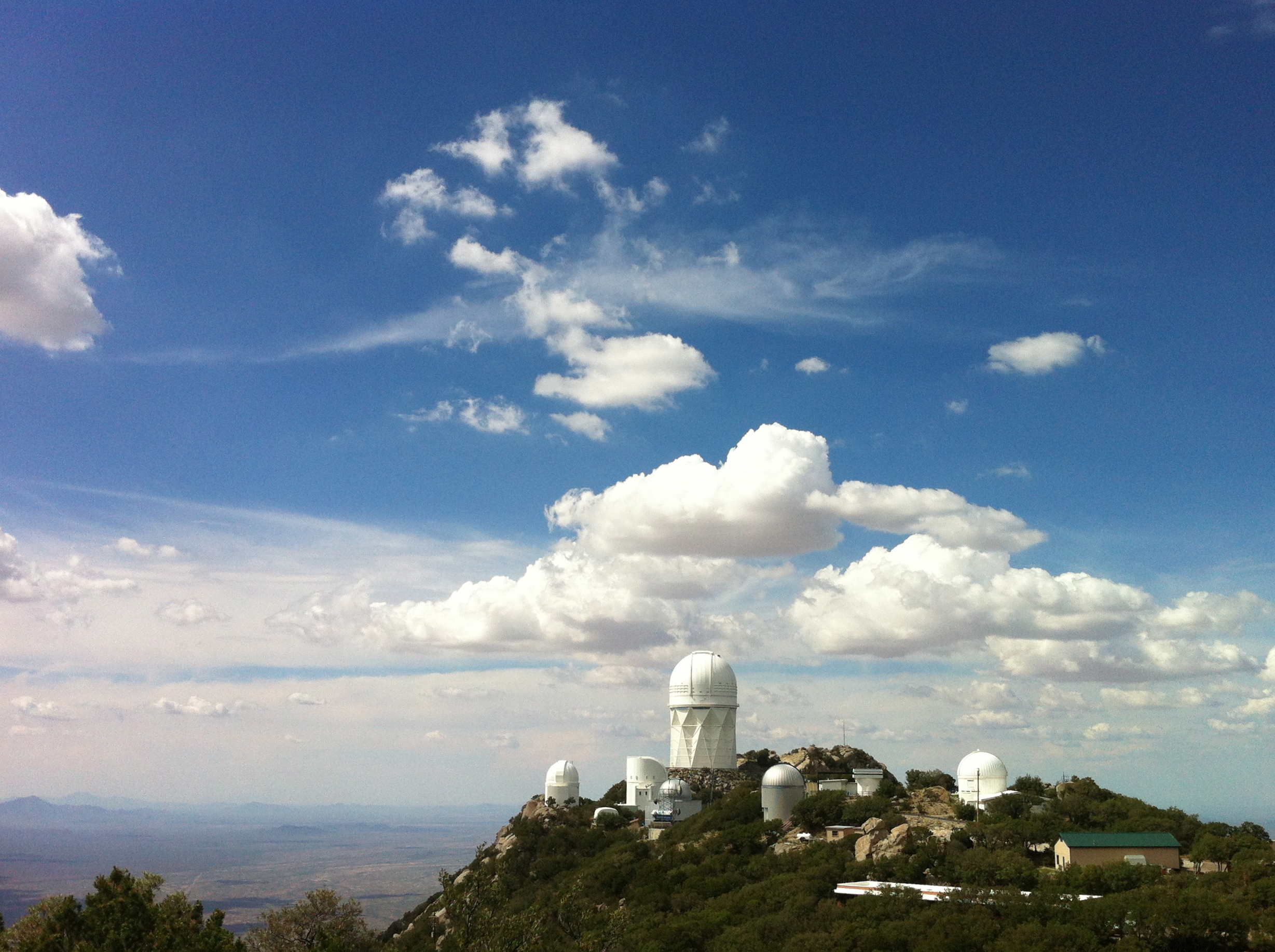
Kitt Peak is the National Observatory of the United States, in contrast to the various benefactor and privately funded telescopes. The largest optical telescope at Kitt Peak is the 4 meter aperture Mayall reflector, and the bureaucracy also supports a variety of other instruments throughout the United States and internationally, but not telescopes such as Hubble, supported by NASA (which is a different government organization).

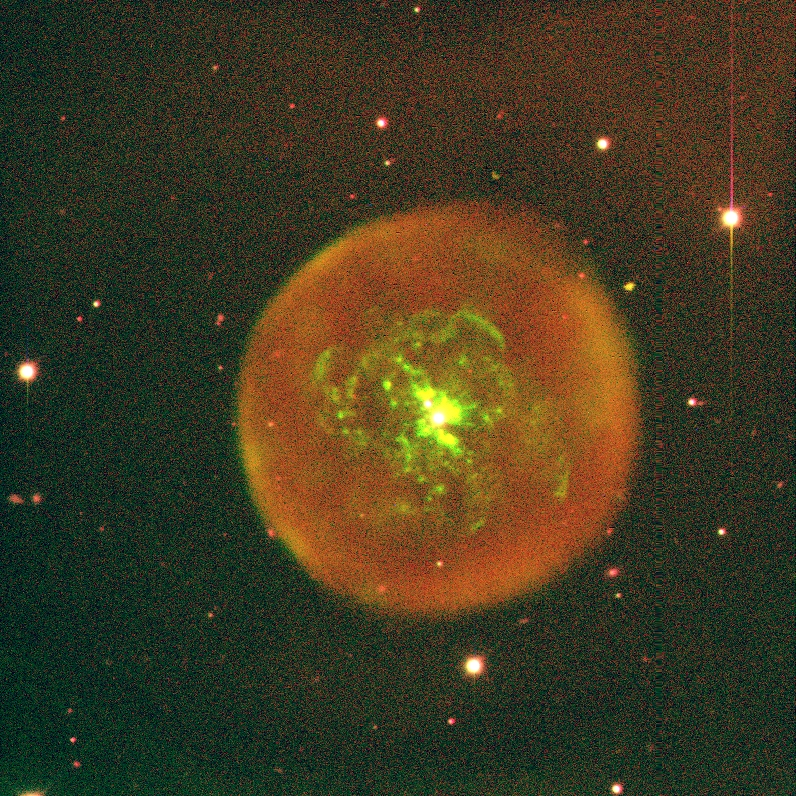
Image of Abell 30 by the 4-meter (158 inch) aperture Mayall telescope, a ground-based optical telescope

The National Optical Astronomy Observatory (NOAO) was the United States national observatory for ground-based nighttime ultraviolet-optical-infrared (OUVIR) astronomy. The National Science Foundation (NSF) funded NOAO to provide forefront astronomical research facilities for US astronomers. Professional astronomers from any country in the world could apply to use the telescopes operated by NOAO under the NSF's "open skies" policy.

NOAO was operated by the Association of Universities for Research in Astronomy (AURA) under a cooperative agreement with the NSF. Its headquarters in Tucson, Arizona, were co-located with the headquarters of the National Solar Observatory. The budget for NOAO during the 2017 fiscal year was nearly $23 million.

NOAO was founded in 1984 to join the operations of the Kitt Peak National Observatory in the United States with the Cerro Tololo Inter-American Observatory in Chile. On October 1, 2019, NOAO merged its operations with the Gemini Observatory and the Vera C. Rubin Observatory to form NOIRLab.

== Telescopes ==
NOAO operated world class research telescopes in both the northern and southern hemispheres. These telescopes, located at Kitt Peak and Cerro Tololo in the US and Chile respectively, remain in operation under the auspices of the NSF’s NOIRLab. The two sites allow US astronomers to make observations over the entire sky. Instrumentation includes optical to near infrared wavelength (0.4 to 5 micrometers) cameras and spectrometers.

=== Cerro Tololo Inter-American Observatory (CTIO) ===
CTIO has a base and office facility in the seaside town of La Serena, Chile. The CTIO telescopes are located some 70 km inland in the foothills of the Chilean Andes. Access to the observatory is made through the picturesque Elqui Valley.

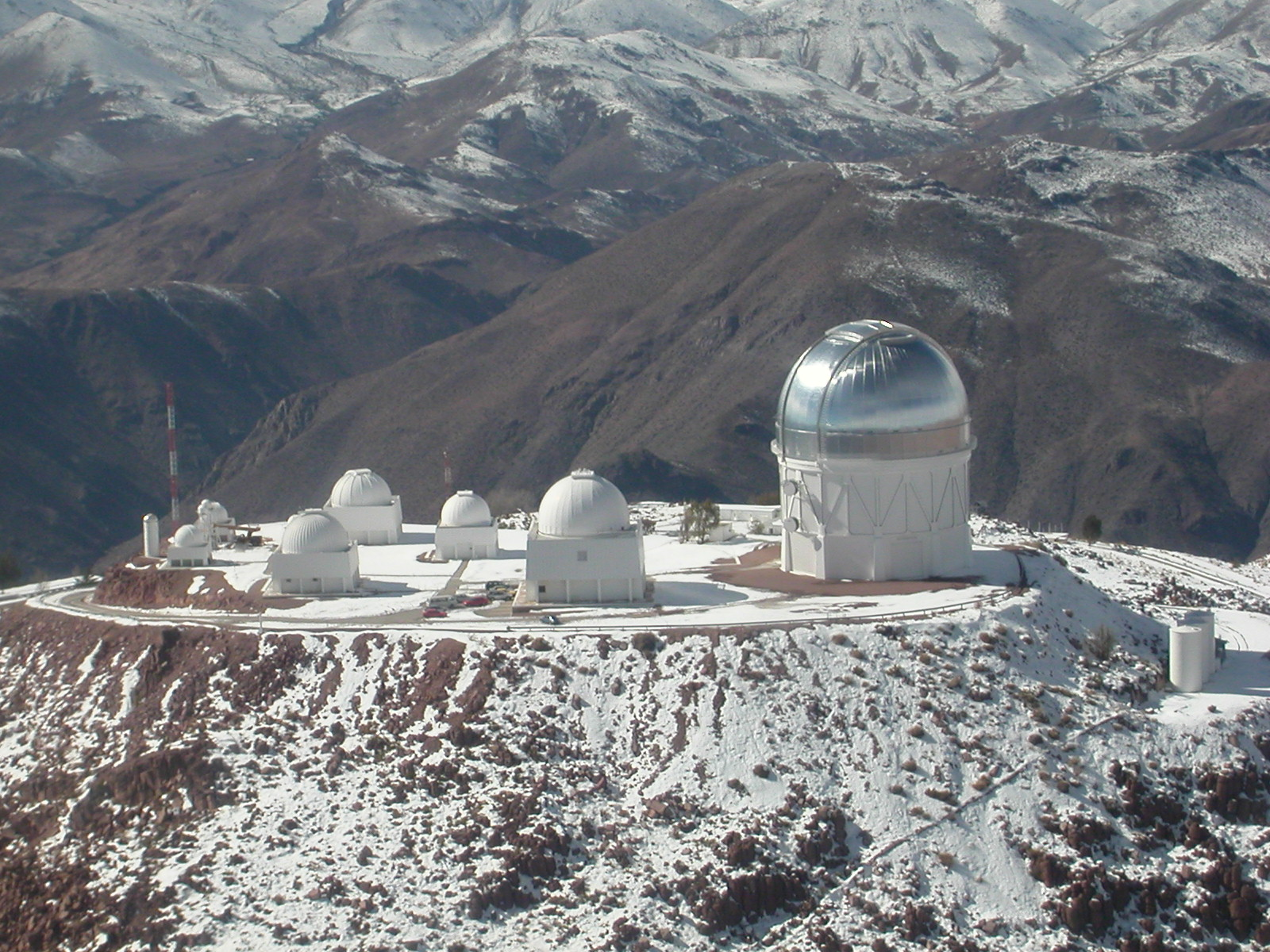
Cerro Tololo Inter-American Observatory

Telescopes at CTIO include the Victor M. Blanco Telescope (named after astronomer Victor Manuel Blanco in 1995) which employs a wide-field of view CCD (Charge-coupled device), a wide field of view near infrared imager (1-2.5 micrometers) and a multi-object fiber fed spectrograph working at visible wavelengths.

The Blanco 4m played the central role in the discovery of dark energy, a poorly understood component to the universe which is currently causing the universe to accelerate in its expansion. The Blanco began hosting a new 3-degree field of view camera called the Dark Energy Camera, also known as DECam, in 2012. This camera is being built at Fermilab in Chicago, USA, and will be operated by CTIO. This instrument was built to execute the Dark Energy Survey, an undertaking to image a large part of the sky to faint light levels, detecting galaxy large scale structure as a function of look back time to shed light on the nature of dark energy.

CTIO operates, and is a partner in the 4.1m Southern Astrophysical Research Telescope (SOAR). SOAR concentrates on high angular resolution observations and will soon deploy an adaptive optics module to help support such observations.

=== Kitt Peak National Observatory (KPNO) ===
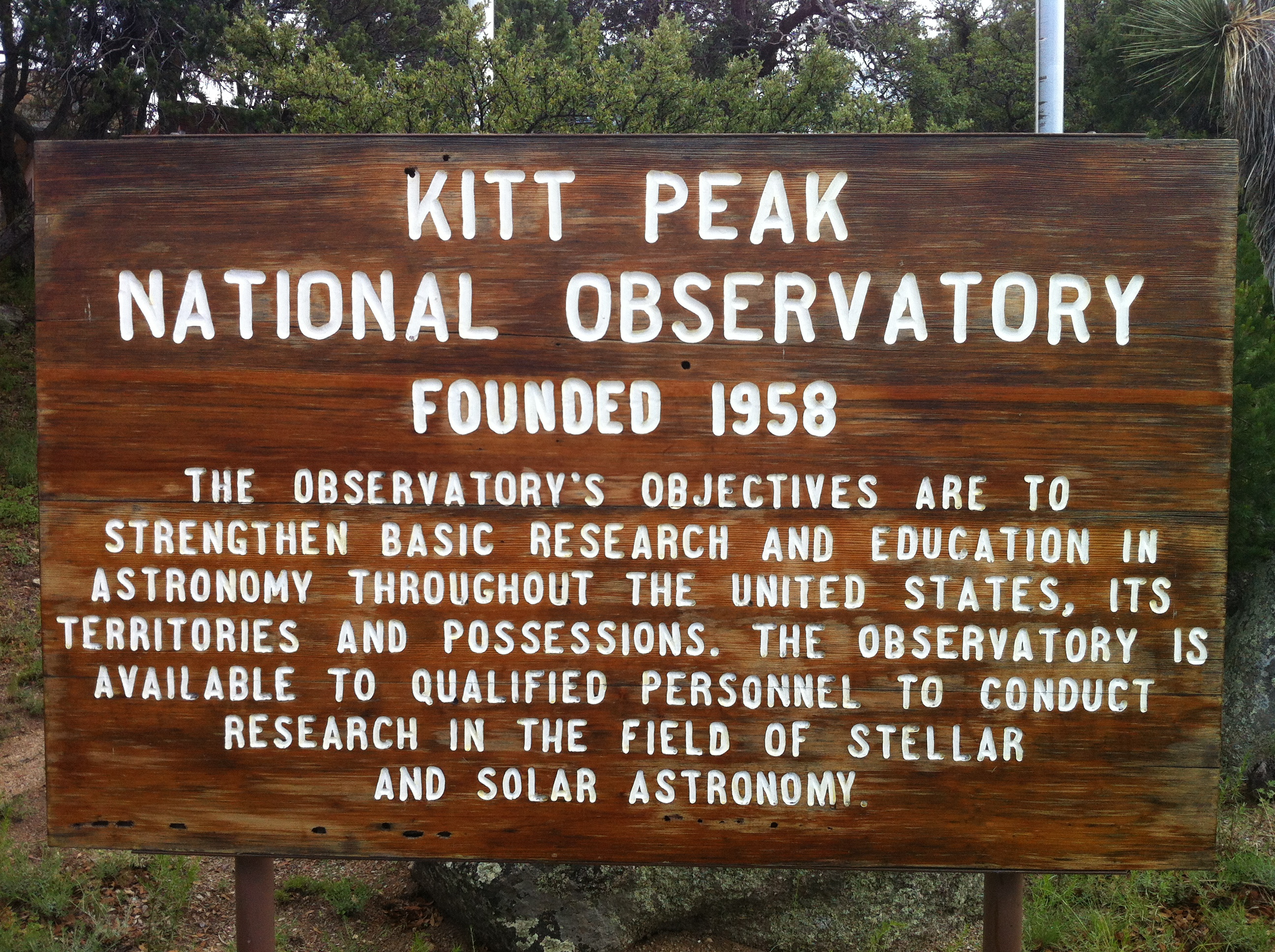
Sign at Kitt Peak National Observatory

KPNO is located near Tucson, Arizona, US. The mountain, Kitt Peak, is part of the tribal lands of the Native American people the Tohono O'odham. The mountain has been leased from the Tohono O'odham since 1958. The native name for the mountain is "loligam" which means manzanita.

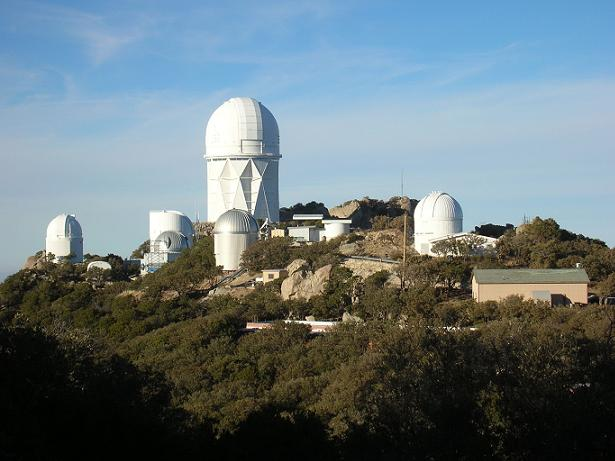
Kitt Peak National Observatory

The observatory was established in 1958, and its largest telescope, the 4-meter Nicholas U. Mayall Telescope, was dedicated in 1973. The Mayall played a key role in the discovery of dark matter though observations of external galaxies which showed that the galaxies rotated faster than they should have if the motion were due only to the mass in stars seen in visible light images.

A new wide field imager working at near infrared wavelengths (NEWFIRM) has been deployed to advance studies of galactic star formation, cosmology, and the structure and evolution of galaxies.

=== NOAO Gemini Science Center (NGSC) ===
NOAO also managed US participation in the international Gemini Observatory. Gemini is a partnership of Argentina, Australia, Brazil, Canada, the United Kingdom, and the United States. The US holds a 50% share of the project (funded by the NSF) which provides public access time on each of Gemini's two 8-meter telescopes. One telescope is located near CTIO in Chile, and the other is located on the island of Hawaii.

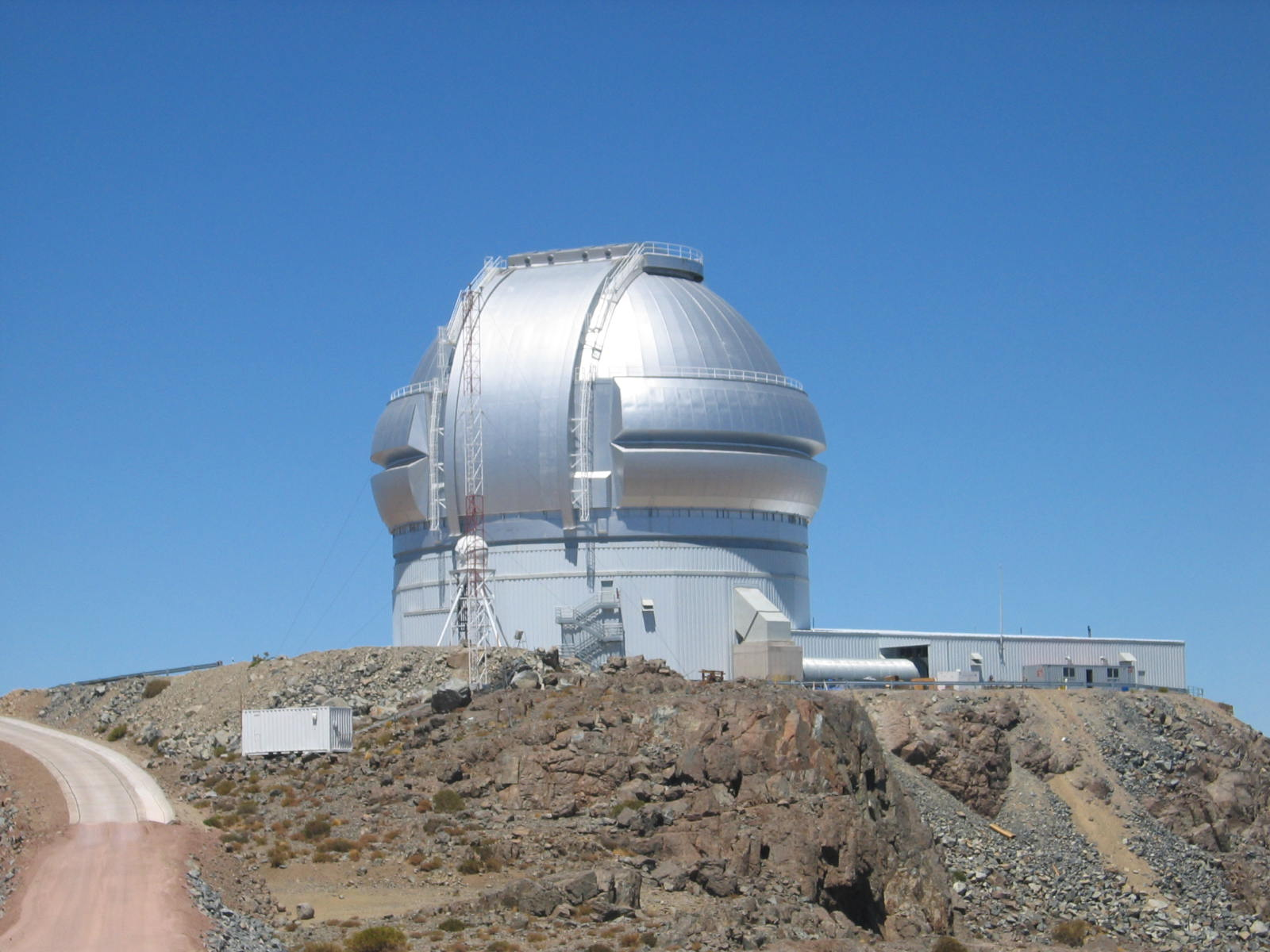
Gemini Observatory on Cerro Pachon in Chile

Gemini is the only facility available to all US astronomers on a permanent basis for large aperture science. Large apertures are typically taken to be between 6.5 m and 10 m. Gemini provides near infrared, mid infrared (10–20 micrometer), and optical imaging and spectroscopy in both the southern and northern hemispheres.

One of Gemini's strengths is high angular resolution imaging accomplished through laser guide star adaptive optics. These facilities are already making an impact. For example, Gemini astronomers, along with their collaborators at the 10m W. M. Keck Observatory, recently announced the first images of an extra solar system with three detected planets circling their parent star, an A-type star known as HR 8799.

=== Vera C. Rubin Observatory (LSST) ===
NOAO was a founding partner in the Vera C. Rubin Observatory project, formerly known as the Large Synoptic Survey Telescope (LSST). Rubin Observatory is an 8-meter class telescope which will change the way some astronomers do science. More like a large physics program, Rubin Observatory will run its own experiment and provide data to the Rubin Observatory community in the form of images and astronomical catalogs. Rubin Observatory will have a dedicated wide field imager, and the telescope will cover the entire sky visible from the southern hemisphere approximately every week. By repeating the observations over and over for ten years, the Rubin Observatory will produce a very deep image of the sky, but it will also detect large numbers of astronomical objects which vary in brightness daily or on longer time scales. Rubin Observatory scientists will analyze, or "mine", the LSST data rather than go to the telescope to make their own observations.

Rubin Observatory is currently in the pre-construction phase, with first light targeted for 2023. During this phase, AURA is managing for design and development of the Rubin Observatory telescope system and site facilities. Rubin Observatory will be located on Cerro Pachón in Chile, near the Gemini and SOAR telescopes. It will be operated by NOIRLab and SLAC National Accelerator Laboratory.

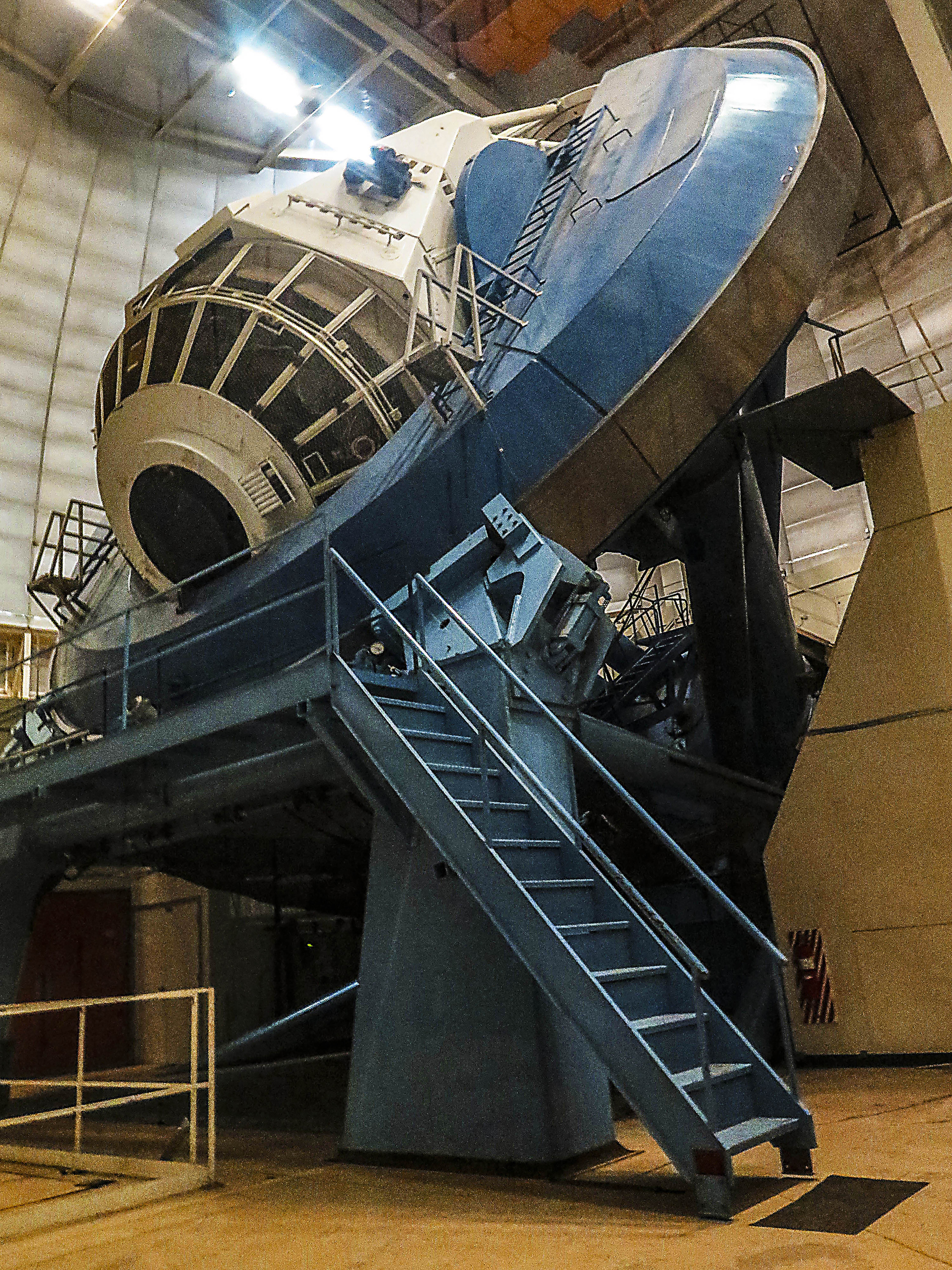
The 4-meter aperture Mayall telescope

At the beginning of the new millennium, the National Academy of Sciences published its report on Astronomy and Astrophysics in the coming decade. Among other high priorities, the committee responsible for the report concluded:

U.S. ground-based optical and infrared facilities...should...be viewed by the National Science Foundation (NSF) and the astronomical community as a single integrated system drawing on both federal and nonfederal funding sources. Effective national organizations are essential to coordinate, and to ensure the success and efficiency of, these systems. Universities and independent observatories should work with the national organizations to ensure the success of these systems.

NOAO has worked very hard with the US community in the ensuing years in developing this System. A clear success story is the public access to non-federal large aperture telescopes through the NSF funded and NOAO managed Telescope System Instrumentation Program (TSIP). This program, accomplished with the enthusiastic support of the US non federal observatories, supplies the broad US community with some 70 nights of observing time per year.

This System goal was further reiterated by the NSF Senior Review in 2007 when it reviewed the full suite of NSF ground-based astronomy facilities. NOAO continued to work on behalf of the community to effectively shape the System and gain steady, state-of-the-art research capabilities of all apertures for open, merit based science.

A future major capability for the US system is an Extremely Large Telescope with diameter up to 30 meters. Two private consortia are currently working on such projects which may be operational before the end of the decade. These are the Thirty Meter Telescope and Giant Magellan Telescope. NOAO was working with both projects in planning for potential future involvement of the broad US community through operational support funding by the NSF.

== See also ==
- Other Optical Observatories in Chile
  - Europe's Very Large Telescope & La Silla Observatory
  - Carnegie Institution of Washington's Las Campanas Observatory
  - The Magellan telescopes
- Other Optical Observatories in Arizona
  - The Large Binocular Telescope
  - The Lowell Observatory
  - The MMT Observatory
  - The Steward Observatory
- World Wide Observatories
  - List of observatories
