= Abell 78 =

Planetary nebula in the constellation of Cygnus

Emission nebula
- Planetary nebula
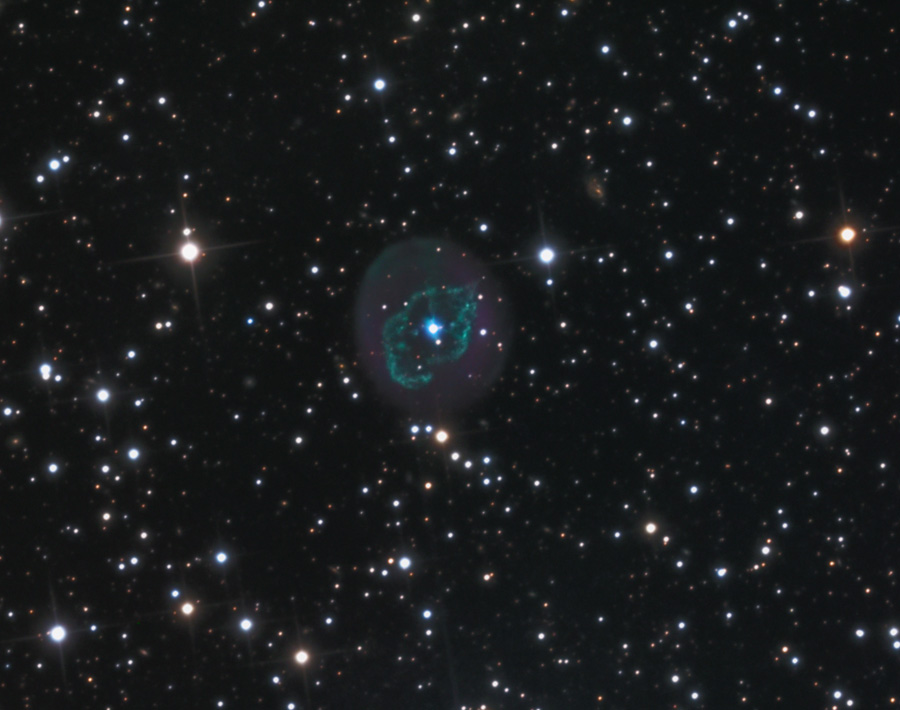
- As Seen From Mount Lemmon Sky Center

Observation data: J2000.0 epoch
- Right ascension: 21^{h} 35^{m} 29.376^{s}
- Declination: +31° 41^{m} 45.6^{s}
- Distance: ~5000 ly
- Apparent magnitude (V): 13.25
- Apparent dimensions (V): 1.78′ × 1.78′
- Constellation: Cygnus

Physical characteristics
- Radius: 1.4 ly
- Designations: PK 081-14.1, PN G 081.2-14.9, Abel 64, ARO 174, 2MASS J21352938+3141453, CSI+31-21334, UBV 18570, UBV M 44681

Abell 78, also known as the Wedding Ring, is a planetary nebula located in the constellation of Cygnus at a distance of about 5,000 light years.

== History ==
Abell 78 was discovered in 1955 by George Ogden Abell. He discovered the nebula on a plate of the Palomar Observatory Sky Survey. The nebula's discovery was published in 1966 along with 86 other planetary nebulae Abell discovered in the survey.

== Structure ==
It has a fainter halo consisting mostly hydrogen, an inner elliptical ring that is mostly made of helium and some inner knots that surround the central star and are extremely depleted in hydrogen. These inner knots were created by a very late thermal pulse, a re-ignition of thermonuclear activity in the helium shell of the star observed after the star left the asymptotic giant branch and is accompanied by strong stellar winds.

The central star of the planetary nebula has a spectral type of [WC5], similar to that of a carbon-rich Wolf–Rayet star. The spectrum of the inner knots is indicative of the presence of a binary system.

== Gallery ==
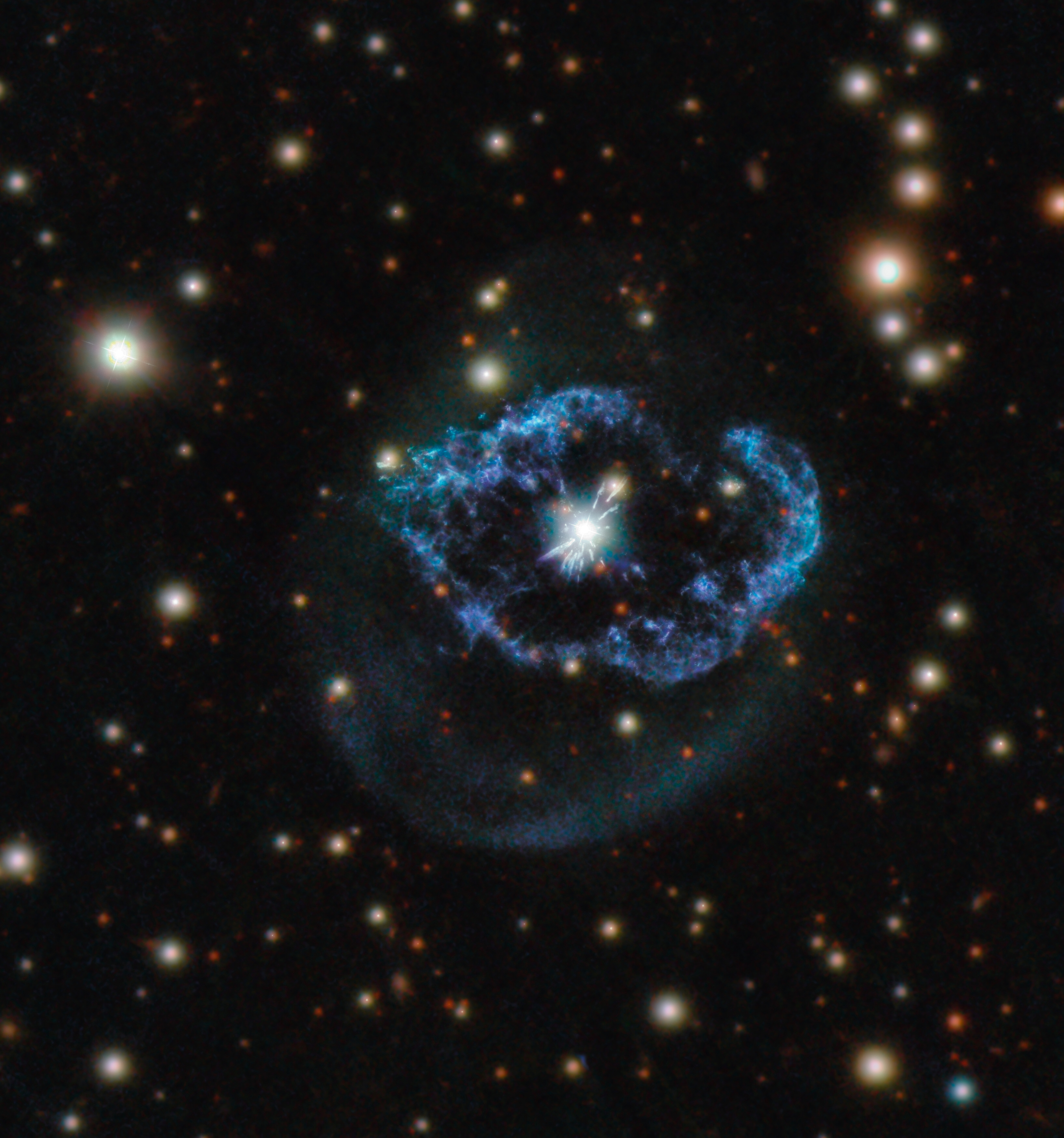
An unusual type of Planetary Nebula
