= John Gallagher III =

American astronomer

John S. Gallagher III
- Born: 1947 (age 78–79)
- Citizenship: USA
- Education: Princeton, University of Wisconsin-Madison
- Scientific career
- Doctoral advisor: Arthur Code

John (Jay) S. Gallagher III is an American astronomer and an expert on star formation in external galaxies, dwarf galaxies and dark matter. He is the William Morgan Professor of Astronomy at the University of Wisconsin-Madison where he has been a professor since 1991.

== Background ==
He was raised near New York City and received his undergraduate education at Princeton University. He performed his graduate work at the University of Wisconsin–Madison, and was awarded a Ph.D in 1972. His supervisor was Arthur Code.

After graduating he held positions at the National Optical Astronomy Observatory and at the University of Illinois, and was the director of the Lowell Observatory. He is currently a Professor of Astronomy at the University of Wisconsin–Madison and last Editor of the Astronomical Journal.

== Scientific contributions ==
Some of Gallagher's major scientific contributions include a review article he wrote along with Sandra Faber in 1979 that convinced most astronomers that dark matter was real. In the 1980s, with Deidre Hunter, he made the first substantial studies of dwarf irregular galaxies. He was later led research on some of the first methods for quantifying star formation in galaxies. Gallagher has made other major contributions towards our understanding of star formation in galaxies, the formation and evolution of low mass galaxies and stellar nova.

Gallagher was one of the leaders of the team which built the Wide Field Planetary Camera 2 for the Hubble Space Telescope.
