= Brian C. Williams =

Computer scientist and MIT professor

- Born: Brian Charles Williams
- Education: Massachusetts Institute of Technology (SB, SM, PhD)
- Known for: Model-based autonomy; Model-based diagnosis (GDE, Sherlock); Livingstone and Remote Agent (Deep Space 1); Risk-bounded planning
- Awards: NASA Space Act Award (1999); NASA Software of the Year (co-recipient, 1999); NASA Group Achievement Award (2000, 2004); AAAI Fellow (2008)
- Scientific career
- Fields: Artificial intelligence, aerospace engineering, robotics, automated planning and scheduling
- Workplaces: Massachusetts Institute of Technology (1999–present); NASA Ames Research Center (1994–1999); Xerox PARC (1989–1994)
- Thesis: Invention from First Principles via Topologies of Interaction (1989)
- Doctoral advisor: Randall Davis
- Doctoral students: Lars Blackmore; Julie Shah
- Website: mers.csail.mit.edu

Brian Charles Williams is a computer scientist and professor of aeronautics and astronautics at the Massachusetts Institute of Technology (MIT), where he is a member of the MIT Computer Science and Artificial Intelligence Laboratory (CSAIL) and leads the Model-based Embedded and Robotic Systems (MERS) group. He is known for his foundational contributions to model-based diagnosis, qualitative reasoning, model-based autonomy, and risk-bounded planning for autonomous systems.

In the late 1980s and early 1990s, Williams collaborated with Johan de Kleer and worked at the Xerox Palo Alto Research Center (PARC), where they developed the General Diagnostic Engine (GDE) and Sherlock systems for diagnosing multiple faults in physical devices. From 1994 to 1999, he worked at NASA's Ames Research Center, where he formed the Autonomous Systems Area, created the Livingstone model-based health management engine, and co-invented the Remote Agent autonomous control system. Demonstrated in flight aboard NASA's Deep Space 1 spacecraft in May 1999, Remote Agent was the first artificial intelligence system to command a deep-space probe autonomously, earning Williams a 1999 NASA Space Act Award and a share of the 1999 NASA Software of the Year Award.

After joining the MIT faculty in 1999, Williams founded the MERS group to advance model-based programming, risk-bounded decision-making, and human–robot teamwork across space, air, land, and underwater vehicles. He was elected a Fellow of the Association for the Advancement of Artificial Intelligence (AAAI) in 2008, served as president of the International Conference on Automated Planning and Scheduling (ICAPS) from 2016 to 2018, and was General Chair of the 37th AAAI Conference on Artificial Intelligence (AAAI-23).

== Education ==
Williams earned his S.B. (1981), S.M. (1984), and Ph.D. (1989) in electrical engineering and computer science from the Massachusetts Institute of Technology. His graduate research at MIT addressed qualitative reasoning about physical systems, including a 1984 study on the qualitative analysis of MOS circuits published in Artificial Intelligence.

Williams completed his doctoral dissertation, Invention from First Principles via Topologies of Interaction, in 1989 in MIT's Department of Electrical Engineering and Computer Science under the supervision of Randall Davis.

== Career ==
=== Xerox PARC (1989–1994) ===
From 1989 to 1994, Williams was a researcher at the Xerox Palo Alto Research Center (PARC) in Palo Alto, California. Beginning in the late 1980s and continuing at PARC, he collaborated with Johan de Kleer to pioneer multiple-fault model-based diagnosis through the General Diagnostic Engine (GDE) and Sherlock systems.

=== NASA Ames Research Center (1994–1999) ===
In 1994, Williams joined NASA's Ames Research Center at Moffett Field, California, where he established the Autonomous Systems Area. There, with P. Pandurang Nayak and collaborators, he developed the Livingstone model-based health management engine and the Burton model-based execution system.

Together with Nicola Muscettola, P. Pandurang Nayak, Barney Pell, and engineers at NASA Ames and the Jet Propulsion Laboratory (JPL), Williams co-invented the Remote Agent autonomous control architecture. As a member of the Deep Space 1 flight team—the first mission under NASA's New Millennium Program—he participated in the May 1999 in-flight demonstration in which Remote Agent autonomously planned activities, diagnosed simulated hardware failures, and reconfigured the spacecraft without ground intervention. For this work, Williams received a 1999 NASA Space Act Award, and the Remote Agent software was named co-winner of NASA's 1999 Software of the Year Award.

=== Massachusetts Institute of Technology (1999–present) ===
Williams joined the faculty of the MIT Department of Aeronautics and Astronautics in 1999 as the Boeing Associate Professor of Aeronautics and Astronautics (1999–2001), subsequently serving as the Finmeccanica Professor of Aeronautics and Astronautics (2001–2002), Associate Professor (2002–2007), and full Professor of Aeronautics and Astronautics from 2007 onward. At MIT, he founded and directs the Model-based Embedded and Robotic Systems (MERS) group, affiliated with CSAIL and the Department of Aeronautics and Astronautics, and is also affiliated with the MIT Space Systems Laboratory.

During a 2006–2007 sabbatical, Williams held visiting appointments at SRI International and the Monterey Bay Aquarium Research Institute (MBARI) in California, as well as the Cork Constraint Computation Centre at University College Cork in Ireland.

Williams has advised numerous doctoral students in autonomous systems, planning, and robotics at MIT, including Lars Blackmore (PhD 2007), Julie Shah (PhD 2011), and Masahiro Ono (PhD 2012).

=== Advisory and professional service ===
In 2000, Williams served on the Mars Program Independent Assessment Team (known as the Tom Young Blue Ribbon Team), convened by NASA to review its Mars exploration program following the losses of the Mars Climate Orbiter and Mars Polar Lander. He has served on the Advisory Council and Technical Division Advisory Board of the NASA Jet Propulsion Laboratory at the California Institute of Technology, and co-led the 2012 Keck Institute for Space Studies workshop on Engineering Resilient Space Systems.

Within the artificial intelligence community, Williams served on the Executive Council of the International Conference on Automated Planning and Scheduling (ICAPS) from 2012 to 2018, including as President-Elect (2014–2016) and President (2016–2018), and co-chaired ICAPS 2012. He has also served on the AAAI Executive Council and was General Chair of the 37th AAAI Conference on Artificial Intelligence (AAAI-23) in 2023. His editorial service includes serving as guest editor for Artificial Intelligence and on the editorial boards of the Journal of Artificial Intelligence Research, the Journal of Field Robotics, and MIT Press.

== Research ==
=== Model-based diagnosis and qualitative reasoning ===
Williams's early research established formal methods for reasoning about physical systems from declarative component models rather than hand-crafted fault rules. In 1987, he and Johan de Kleer introduced the General Diagnostic Engine (GDE), which combined assumption-based truth maintenance with probabilistic reasoning and information-theoretic measurement selection to diagnose multiple simultaneous faults. Their 1989 Sherlock system extended GDE to incorporate explicit behavioral modes for both nominal and faulty component operation. In 1991, Williams published a hybrid qualitative and quantitative algebraic reasoning framework unifying symbolic causal analysis with numerical constraints.

=== Model-based autonomy and programming ===
At NASA Ames, Williams extended model-based diagnosis into closed-loop autonomous control. The Livingstone engine framed spacecraft health management as a propositional feedback controller using a single declarative transition model to perform both mode identification (tracking component health) and mode reconfiguration (computing recovery actions after faults). Integrated with an onboard planner and executive in Remote Agent, this architecture was flight-validated on Deep Space 1 in 1999.

At MIT, Williams and his students developed model-based programming—represented by the Reactive Model-based Programming Language (RMPL) and the Titan model-based executive—allowing engineers to specify high-level mission goals and state trajectories while an embedded deductive engine handles real-time monitoring, diagnosis, and recovery. To solve the underlying discrete optimization and constraint satisfaction subproblems at reactive timescales, Williams and Robert J. Ragno introduced Conflict-directed A* (CDA*), which generalizes conflict-directed search to prioritize likely system states and diagnoses.

=== Risk-bounded planning and collaborative robotics ===
Subsequent work in the MERS group focused on risk-bounded planning and stochastic control for uncertain environments, applying chance-constrained optimization and model predictive control to compute trajectories and schedules that bound the probability of failure. Williams has also worked on human–robot teamwork and cooperative autonomous robotics, including the Chaski human-inspired plan execution system developed with Julie Shah and Cynthia Breazeal, as well as applications in deep-sea exploration with autonomous underwater vehicles, cooperative manufacturing assembly, autonomous air flight management, and autonomous driving.

== Awards and honors ==
- 2008: Elected Fellow of the Association for the Advancement of Artificial Intelligence (AAAI), cited "for significant contributions to model-based reasoning and autonomous systems, and the innovative application of AI to space exploration"
- 2004: NASA Group Achievement Award, Portable Satellite Assistant First Generation Team
- 2004: Best Paper Award, European Conference on Artificial Intelligence (ECAI)
- 2003: Finalist, World Technology Award for Space
- 2001: Distinguished Paper Award, International Joint Conference on Artificial Intelligence (IJCAI)
- 2000: NASA Group Achievement Award for the Independent Assessment of the Mars Climate Orbiter and Mars Polar Lander Failures
- 1999: NASA Space Act Award for Remote Agent and work in the Autonomous Systems Area
- 1999: NASA Software of the Year Award (co-recipient, Remote Agent team)

Williams and his research group have also received best paper awards at conferences including AAAI (1988, 1997, 2016), AIAA (2006), ICAPS (2008, 2014, 2016), IEEE CDC (2009, 2010), and HRI (2011).

== Selected publications ==
- Williams, Brian C. (December 1984). "Qualitative analysis of MOS circuits". Artificial Intelligence. 24 (1–3): 281–346. doi:10.1016/0004-3702(84)90041-9.
- de Kleer, Johan; Williams, Brian C. (April 1987). "Diagnosing multiple faults". Artificial Intelligence. 32 (1): 97–130. doi:10.1016/0004-3702(87)90063-4.
- de Kleer, Johan; Williams, Brian C. (August 1989). "Diagnosis with Behavioral Modes". Proceedings of the Eleventh International Joint Conference on Artificial Intelligence (IJCAI-89). pp. 1324–1329.
- Williams, Brian C. (October 1991). "A theory of interactions: unifying qualitative and quantitative algebraic reasoning". Artificial Intelligence. 51 (1–3): 39–94. doi:10.1016/0004-3702(91)90108-V.
- Williams, Brian C.; Nayak, P. Pandurang (1996). "A Model-Based Approach to Reactive Self-Configuring Systems" (PDF). Proceedings of the Thirteenth National Conference on Artificial Intelligence (AAAI-96). pp. 971–978.
- Muscettola, Nicola; Nayak, P. Pandurang; Pell, Barney; Williams, Brian C. (August 1998). "Remote Agent: to boldly go where no AI system has gone before". Artificial Intelligence. 103 (1–2): 5–47. doi:10.1016/S0004-3702(98)00068-X.
- Williams, Brian C.; Ingham, Michel D.; Chung, Seung H.; Elliott, Paul H. (January 2003). "Model-based programming of intelligent embedded systems and robotic space explorers". Proceedings of the IEEE. 91 (1): 212–237. doi:10.1109/JPROC.2002.805828.
- Williams, Brian C.; Ragno, Robert J. (June 2007). "Conflict-directed A* and its role in model-based embedded systems". Discrete Applied Mathematics. 155 (12): 1562–1595. doi:10.1016/j.dam.2005.10.022.
- Ono, Masahiro; Williams, Brian C. (2008). "Iterative Risk Allocation: A new approach to robust Model Predictive Control with a joint chance constraint". 2008 47th IEEE Conference on Decision and Control. pp. 3427–3432. doi:10.1109/CDC.2008.4739221.
- Blackmore, Lars; Ono, Masahiro; Bektassov, Askar; Williams, Brian C. (June 2010). "A Probabilistic Particle-Control Approximation of Chance-Constrained Stochastic Predictive Control". IEEE Transactions on Robotics. 26 (3): 502–517. doi:10.1109/TRO.2010.2044948.
- Shah, Julie; Wiken, James; Williams, Brian; Breazeal, Cynthia (March 2011). "Improved human-robot team performance using chaski, a human-inspired plan execution system". Proceedings of the 6th International Conference on Human-Robot Interaction (HRI '11). pp. 29–36. doi:10.1145/1957656.1957668.
- Blackmore, Lars; Ono, Masahiro; Williams, Brian C. (December 2011). "Chance-Constrained Optimal Path Planning With Obstacles". IEEE Transactions on Robotics. 27 (6): 1080–1094. doi:10.1109/TRO.2011.2161160.

== See also ==
- Deep Space 1
- Model-based reasoning
- Lars Blackmore
- Julie Shah
- Johan de Kleer
