= De Kleer =

De Kleer is a Dutch surname. Notable people with the surname include:

- Johan de Kleer, computer scientist, father of Katherine
- Katherine de Kleer, American planetary scientist, daughter of Johan
- Martijn de Kleer, rock musician for The Legendary Pink Dots
- Peter de Kleer (1910–1996), Dutch pianist
