= Behçet Açıkmeşe =

Aerospace and control systems engineer

- Born: Ahmet Behçet Açıkmeşe; Ardeşen, Turkey
- Education: Middle East Technical University (BS); Indiana University–Purdue University Indianapolis (MS); Purdue University (PhD)
- Known for: Lossless convexification; G-FOLD powered-descent guidance; Successive convexification; Mars Science Laboratory flyaway guidance
- Awards: NSF CAREER Award (2015); IEEE Control Systems Society Award for Technical Excellence in Aerospace Control (2019); IEEE Fellow (2022); AIAA Fellow (2023)
- Scientific career
- Fields: Aerospace engineering, control theory, convex optimization, guidance, navigation, and control
- Workplaces: University of California, Berkeley (2026–present); University of Washington (2016–2026); University of Texas at Austin (2012–2015); Jet Propulsion Laboratory (2003–2012); California Institute of Technology (2012)
- Thesis: Stabilization, observation, tracking, and disturbance rejection for uncertain/nonlinear and time-varying systems (2002)
- Doctoral advisor: Martin Corless
- Website: UC Berkeley EECS profile

Ahmet Behçet Açıkmeşe is an aerospace engineer, control theorist, and academic who serves as Chancellor's Professor in the Department of Electrical Engineering and Computer Sciences and the Department of Mechanical Engineering at the University of California, Berkeley. He previously spent a decade on the faculty of the University of Washington (2016–2026), served on the faculty of the University of Texas at Austin (2012–2015), and worked as a senior technologist at NASA's Jet Propulsion Laboratory (2003–2012).

Açıkmeşe is best known for developing lossless convexification—a mathematical method that reformulates non-convex optimal control problems as tractable convex optimization problems with guaranteed global optimality—and for co-developing the G-FOLD (Guidance for Fuel-Optimal Large Diverts) powered-descent guidance algorithm with Lars Blackmore and colleagues at JPL. Flight-tested on vertical-landing rockets, the technique enabled real-time onboard trajectory optimization for planetary pinpoint landing and reusable launch vehicles. At JPL, he also developed the "flyaway" guidance and control algorithms used in the Mars Science Laboratory (Curiosity) and Mars 2020 (Perseverance) landings, as well as reaction control system algorithms for the Soil Moisture Active Passive (SMAP) satellite.

He is a Fellow of the Institute of Electrical and Electronics Engineers (IEEE) and the American Institute of Aeronautics and Astronautics (AIAA), and received the National Science Foundation CAREER Award (2015) and the IEEE Control Systems Society Award for Technical Excellence in Aerospace Control (2019).

== Early life and education ==
Açıkmeşe was born in Ardeşen, Rize Province, Turkey, to a family of Laz heritage, and lived in several parts of Turkey during his childhood. He earned a Bachelor of Science in civil engineering from Middle East Technical University (METU) in Ankara in June 1992, and worked there as a teaching assistant from October 1992 to June 1994. During this period, he received graduate fellowships from the Scientific and Technological Research Council of Turkey (1993) and the Turkish Ministry of Education (1994–1996).

In 1994, Açıkmeşe moved to the United States for graduate study. He received a Master of Science in mechanical engineering from Purdue University at Indiana University–Purdue University Indianapolis in May 1996. He then completed his PhD in aeronautics and astronautics at Purdue University in West Lafayette, Indiana, in December 2002, specializing in controls and dynamics with a minor in fluid mechanics. Supervised by Martin Corless, his dissertation, Stabilization, observation, tracking, and disturbance rejection for uncertain/nonlinear and time-varying systems, used Lyapunov stability theory and linear matrix inequalities (LMIs) to synthesize controllers and observers for uncertain, nonlinear, and time-varying systems.

== Career ==
=== NASA Jet Propulsion Laboratory (2003–2012) ===
After serving briefly as a visiting assistant professor in the School of Aeronautics and Astronautics at Purdue University from January to March 2003, Açıkmeşe joined the Guidance and Control Analysis Group at NASA's Jet Propulsion Laboratory (JPL) in Pasadena, California, in April 2003, where he rose to Senior Technologist and Member of Technical Staff. From January to May 2012, he also served as a lecturer in aerospace engineering in the Division of Engineering and applied science at the California Institute of Technology.

At JPL, Açıkmeşe developed guidance, navigation, and control (GN&C) algorithms for planetary landing, spacecraft formation flying, and asteroid and comet sample-return missions. As a GN&C analyst on the Mars Science Laboratory (MSL) entry, descent, and landing team, he designed and delivered the flight algorithms for the "flyaway" phase of the sky crane maneuver, which stabilized the powered descent stage immediately after tether separation and flew it roughly 650 metres (2,130 ft) away from the Curiosity rover during its August 5, 2012 landing on Mars. NASA later reused the same flyaway algorithms for the Mars 2020 Perseverance rover landing. He also developed the flight GN&C algorithms for the reaction control system of NASA's Soil Moisture Active Passive (SMAP) Earth-observing satellite, which launched in 2015.

During his tenure at JPL, Açıkmeşe originated the convex optimization approach to powered-descent guidance and, with Lars Blackmore, John M. Carson III, and Daniel P. Scharf, developed the theoretical framework of lossless convexification and the G-FOLD (Guidance for Fuel-Optimal Large Diverts) landing algorithm. He served as Technical Principal Investigator for JPL's Autonomous Descent and Ascent Powered-flight Testbed (ADAPT), which partnered with Masten Space Systems to test G-FOLD in flight on Masten's Xombie vertical-takeoff, vertical-landing rocket.

=== University of Texas at Austin (2012–2015) ===
In August 2012, Açıkmeşe joined the Department of Aerospace Engineering and Engineering Mechanics at the University of Texas at Austin as an assistant professor, where he founded and directed the Autonomous Guidance, Navigation, and Control Laboratory. While at UT Austin, he continued collaborating with JPL and Masten Space Systems on the ADAPT flight-test campaigns at the Mojave Air and Space Port, including a September 20, 2013 flight in which G-FOLD computed and executed a 0.8 kilometres (0.50 mi) three-dimensional divert in real time onboard Xombie—achieving roughly six times the divert range of the guidance software used for Curiosity—followed by 2014 flights integrating G-FOLD with terrain relative navigation.

In 2015, Açıkmeşe received a National Science Foundation CAREER Award of $500,000 for his project Real-time Convex Optimization for High-Performance Control of Autonomous Systems. That same year, he began serving as an associate editor of IEEE Transactions on Control Systems Technology.

=== University of Washington (2016–2026) ===
In January 2016, Açıkmeşe joined the William E. Boeing Department of Aeronautics & Astronautics at the University of Washington (UW) as an associate professor, with an adjunct appointment in the Department of Electrical & Computer Engineering, and established the Autonomous Controls Laboratory (ACL). He was later promoted to full professor and also served as an associate editor of the AIAA Journal of Guidance, Control, and Dynamics (starting in 2016) and as a technical associate editor of IEEE Control Systems Magazine.

At UW, Açıkmeşe and his students expanded convex trajectory optimization beyond three-degree-of-freedom powered descent to six-degree-of-freedom (6-DoF) attitude-coupled rocket landing, aerodynamic drag, and state-triggered constraints via successive convexification. Under NASA's Safe and Precise Landing – Integrated Capabilities Evolution (SPLICE) program, his group collaborated with NASA Johnson Space Center, Blue Origin, and Draper Laboratory to mature real-time planetary landing guidance algorithms, including open-loop flight tests in 2020 and payload testing on Blue Origin's New Shepard suborbital vehicle. By 2023, his lab and collaborators demonstrated customized first-order solvers capable of solving 6-DoF dual-quaternion powered-descent guidance problems in under one second onboard flight-like processors, earning the 2023 AIAA Guidance, Navigation, and Control Best Paper Award.

=== University of California, Berkeley (2026–present) ===
In 2026, after a decade at the University of Washington, Açıkmeşe joined the University of California, Berkeley as Chancellor's Professor in the Department of Electrical Engineering and Computer Sciences—shared between the College of Engineering and the College of Computing, Data Science, and Society—with a joint appointment in the Department of Mechanical Engineering. He relocated the Autonomous Controls Lab to UC Berkeley, continuing research on optimization-based autonomy for aerospace and robotic systems.

== Research ==
Açıkmeşe's research lies at the intersection of control theory, convex optimization, and aerospace engineering, with an emphasis on real-time algorithms carrying mathematical guarantees of feasibility, convergence, and safety.

=== Lossless convexification and powered-descent guidance ===
Computing fuel-optimal rocket landing trajectories is inherently a non-convex optimization problem because rocket engines cannot throttle continuously down to zero thrust (creating a non-zero lower thrust bound) and are subject to thrust-pointing limits. Beginning in 2007 and formalized in papers with Lars Blackmore, John M. Carson III, and Matthew W. Harris, Açıkmeşe established lossless convexification (LCvx): by relaxing the non-convex thrust constraint into a convex second-order cone constraint using slack variables, the relaxed problem can be solved globally in polynomial time, and—using Pontryagin's maximum principle—any optimal solution of the relaxed problem is guaranteed to satisfy the original non-convex constraints. Packaged into G-FOLD and paired with customized interior-point method solvers developed with Daniel Dueri, the method was demonstrated in closed-loop rocket flight tests by JPL and influenced onboard guidance architectures for reusable orbital boosters.

=== Successive convexification and embedded solvers ===
To address optimal control problems whose nonlinear dynamics or non-convex state constraints do not admit exact lossless relaxations, Açıkmeşe and his students developed successive convexification (SCvx), a sequential convex programming framework with convergence guarantees. His group applied SCvx to 6-DoF rocket landing with aerodynamic effects and state-triggered constraints, continuous-time constraint satisfaction, and cislunar rendezvous and proximity operations. Alongside problem formulations, the Autonomous Controls Lab has developed flight-oriented numerical solvers—including customized proportional-integral projected gradient (PIPG) first-order methods and the open-source QOCO quadratic-objective conic optimizer—for deterministic, low-memory execution on embedded processors.

=== Swarms, Markov decision processes, and robust control ===
Açıkmeşe has also contributed to robust control, model predictive control for aerospace systems, and probabilistic guidance for large-scale multi-agent systems. With JPL senior research scientist David S. Bayard and subsequent doctoral students, he formulated decentralized density control and safety-constrained policy synthesis for swarms of autonomous vehicles using Markov chains and Markov decision processes.

== Awards and honors ==
- 2023: Elected Fellow of the American Institute of Aeronautics and Astronautics (AIAA)
- 2023: AIAA Guidance, Navigation, and Control Best Paper Award (with Abhinav G. Kamath, Purnanand Elango, Skye Mceowen, Yue Yu, John M. Carson III, Mehran Mesbahi, and collaborators)
- 2023: IEEE Control Systems Society Control Systems Magazine Outstanding Paper Award (with Danylo Malyuta, Taylor P. Reynolds, Michael Szmuk, Thomas Lew, Riccardo Bonalli, and Marco Pavone)
- 2022: Elevated to IEEE Fellow, cited "for contributions to optimization-based nonlinear control and to planetary landing systems"
- 2019: IEEE Control Systems Society Award for Technical Excellence in Aerospace Control, cited "for outstanding contributions to convex optimization-based control and its transitions and applications to aerospace applications"
- 2016: Asian Journal of Control Best Paper Award (for 2015 paper, with David S. Bayard)
- 2015: National Science Foundation CAREER Award, for Real-time Convex Optimization for High-Performance Control of Autonomous Systems
- 2009, 2013, 2014, 2015: NASA Group Achievement Awards (for spacecraft formation flying, the Mars Science Laboratory GN&C system, and G-FOLD and terrain-relative navigation flight demonstrations on Masten's Xombie rocket)
- 2005, 2008, 2009: NASA Jet Propulsion Laboratory Mariner Award

== Selected publications ==
- Açıkmeşe, Behçet; Ploen, Scott R. (September–October 2007). "Convex Programming Approach to Powered Descent Guidance for Mars Landing". Journal of Guidance, Control, and Dynamics. 30 (5): 1353–1366. doi:10.2514/1.27553.
- Blackmore, Lars; Açıkmeşe, Behçet; Scharf, Daniel P. (July–August 2010). "Minimum-Landing-Error Powered-Descent Guidance for Mars Landing Using Convex Optimization". Journal of Guidance, Control, and Dynamics. 33 (4): 1161–1171. doi:10.2514/1.47202.
- Açıkmeşe, Behçet; Blackmore, Lars (February 2011). "Lossless convexification of a class of optimal control problems with non-convex control constraints". Automatica. 47 (2): 341–347. doi:10.1016/j.automatica.2010.10.037.
- Blackmore, Lars; Açıkmeşe, Behçet; Carson, John M. (August 2012). "Lossless convexification of control constraints for a class of nonlinear optimal control problems". Systems & Control Letters. 61 (8): 863–870. doi:10.1016/j.sysconle.2012.04.010.
- Açıkmeşe, Behçet; Carson, John M.; Blackmore, Lars (November 2013). "Lossless Convexification of Nonconvex Control Bound and Pointing Constraints of the Soft Landing Optimal Control Problem". IEEE Transactions on Control Systems Technology. 21 (6): 2104–2113. doi:10.1109/TCST.2012.2237346.
- Açıkmeşe, Behçet; Sell, Steven W.; San Martin, A. Miguel; Biesiadecki, Jeffrey J. (July–August 2014). "Mars Science Laboratory Flyaway Guidance, Navigation, and Control System Design". Journal of Spacecraft and Rockets. 51 (4): 1227–1236. doi:10.2514/1.A32709.
- Harris, Matthew W.; Açıkmeşe, Behçet (September 2014). "Lossless convexification of non-convex optimal control problems for state constrained linear systems". Automatica. 50 (9): 2304–2311. doi:10.1016/j.automatica.2014.06.008.
- Açıkmeşe, Behçet; Bayard, David S. (July 2015). "Markov Chain Approach to Probabilistic Guidance for Swarms of Autonomous Agents". Asian Journal of Control. 17 (4): 1105–1124. doi:10.1002/asjc.982.
- Mao, Yuanqi; Szmuk, Michael; Açıkmeşe, Behçet (December 2016). "Successive convexification of non-convex optimal control problems and its convergence properties". 2016 IEEE 55th Conference on Decision and Control (CDC). pp. 3636–3641. doi:10.1109/CDC.2016.7798816.
- Dueri, Daniel; Açıkmeşe, Behçet; Scharf, Daniel P.; Harris, Matthew W. (February 2017). "Customized Real-Time Interior-Point Methods for Onboard Powered-Descent Guidance". Journal of Guidance, Control, and Dynamics. 40 (2): 197–212. doi:10.2514/1.G001480.
- Scharf, Daniel P.; Açıkmeşe, Behçet; Dueri, Daniel; Benito, Joel; Casoliva, Jordi (February 2017). "Implementation and Experimental Demonstration of Onboard Powered-Descent Guidance". Journal of Guidance, Control, and Dynamics. 40 (2): 213–229. doi:10.2514/1.G000399.
- Eren, Utku; Prach, Anna; Koçer, Başaran Bahadır; Raković, Saša V.; Kayacan, Erdal; Açıkmeşe, Behçet (July 2017). "Model Predictive Control in Aerospace Systems: Current State and Opportunities". Journal of Guidance, Control, and Dynamics. 40 (7): 1541–1566. doi:10.2514/1.G002507.
- Szmuk, Michael; Reynolds, Taylor P.; Açıkmeşe, Behçet (August 2020). "Successive Convexification for Real-Time Six-Degree-of-Freedom Powered Descent Guidance with State-Triggered Constraints". Journal of Guidance, Control, and Dynamics. 43 (8): 1399–1413. doi:10.2514/1.G004549.
- Malyuta, Danylo; Reynolds, Taylor P.; Szmuk, Michael; Lew, Thomas; Bonalli, Riccardo; Pavone, Marco; Açıkmeşe, Behçet (October 2022). "Convex Optimization for Trajectory Generation: A Tutorial on Generating Dynamically Feasible Trajectories Reliably and Efficiently". IEEE Control Systems. 42 (5): 40–113. doi:10.1109/MCS.2022.3187542.
- Kamath, Abhinav G.; Elango, Purnanand; Mceowen, Skye; Yu, Yue; Carson, John M.; Mesbahi, Mehran; Açıkmeşe, Behçet (January 2023). "Customized Real-Time First-Order Methods for Onboard Dual Quaternion-based 6-DoF Powered-Descent Guidance". AIAA SCITECH 2023 Forum. doi:10.2514/6.2023-2003.

== See also ==
- Lossless convexification
- Lars Blackmore
- Mars Science Laboratory
- Jet Propulsion Laboratory
