= Climate of Little Rock, Arkansas =

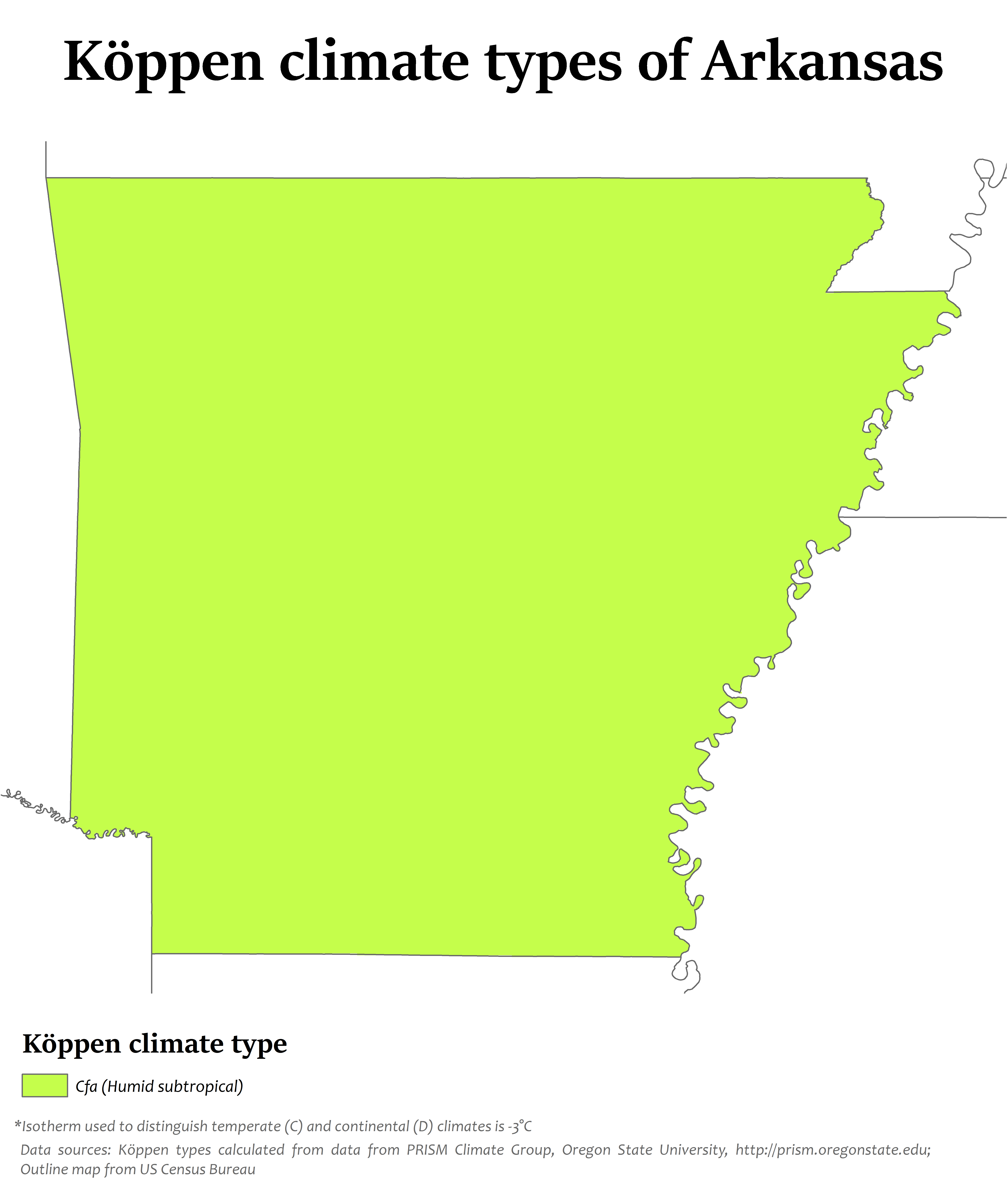
All of Arkansas falls within the humid subtropical Köppen climate classification.

Little Rock has a humid subtropical climate (Köppen Cfa), with hot, usually humid summers, but subject to drought, primarily in late summer. According to the Trewartha climate classification system, Little Rock is subtropical because nine of its months exceed 50 °F (10 °C) in average temperature. Summers are usually hot, occasionally extremely hot; winters are short and cool, but with marked temperature variations, as the area is subject to alternating incursions of warm, moist air from the Gulf of Mexico (possibly producing daily high temperatures in the 70s °F.) and cold, dry air from Canada (possibly producing daily high temperatures below freezing, 32 °F, even in the 20s °F.).

== Precipitation ==
The Little Rock area has nearly 50 inches (1,300 mm) of precipitation per year, on average. Little Rock experiences a prolonged spring wet season, with heavy rainfall a distinct possibility from March to May, and a secondary wet season peaking in November and December. On average, August is the driest month, and July through September is the driest period of the year. Little Rock averages more rain than the national average, but also averages more sunny days than the national average.

Thunderstorms can occur any month of the year, but are especially frequent and severe in spring, when torrential rainfall, damaging thunderstorm winds, hail, and tornadoes are all significant threats; a secondary severe weather season peaks in November. Snow, sleet and freezing rain can occur during the winter season, when cold Canadian air at ground level is overrun by warm, moist air from the Gulf of Mexico. Unless otherwise indicated, all normal data presented below are based on data at Bill and Hillary Clinton National Airport the official Little Rock climatology station, from the 1981−2010 normals period.

== General climatology ==
With an annual mean minimum temperature of 13.6 °F (−10 °C), Little Rock is in USDA plant hardiness zone 8a, allowing the cultivation of some subtropical species such as Crape Myrtle and some cold hardy palms.

=== Temperature ===
Climate data for Little Rock (Clinton National Airport), 1991−2020 normals, (Note: Mean monthly maxima and minima (i.e. the expected highest and lowest temperature readings at any point during the year or given month) calculated based on data at said location from 1991 to 2020.) extremes 1879−present (Note: Official records for Little Rock began on 1 July 1879 at the State Capitol and maintained there until 30 April 1942. The next day, and until 7 August 1942, temperature and precipitation were recorded separately at two different locations in and around Little Rock, and the official climatology station has been Adams Field since 8 August 1942. For more information, see Threadex)
Month	Jan	Feb	Mar	Apr	May	Jun	Jul	Aug	Sep	Oct	Nov	Dec	Year
Record high °F (°C)	83 (28)	87 (31)	91 (33)	95 (35)	98 (37)	107 (42)	112 (44)	114 (46)	106 (41)	98 (37)	86 (30)	81 (27)	114 (46)
Mean maximum °F (°C)	72.0 (22.2)	75.8 (24.3)	82.2 (27.9)	86.2 (30.1)	91.3 (32.9)	96.2 (35.7)	100.2 (37.9)	101.1 (38.4)	96.2 (35.7)	89.2 (31.8)	79.6 (26.4)	72.8 (22.7)	102.4 (39.1)
Mean daily maximum °F (°C)	50.5 (10.3)	55.2 (12.9)	63.7 (17.6)	72.8 (22.7)	80.5 (26.9)	88.2 (31.2)	91.7 (33.2)	91.5 (33.1)	85.1 (29.5)	74.2 (23.4)	61.9 (16.6)	52.6 (11.4)	72.3 (22.4)
Daily mean °F (°C)	40.7 (4.8)	44.7 (7.1)	52.7 (11.5)	61.4 (16.3)	69.9 (21.1)	78.0 (25.6)	81.4 (27.4)	80.8 (27.1)	74.0 (23.3)	62.6 (17.0)	51.1 (10.6)	43.0 (6.1)	61.7 (16.5)
Mean daily minimum °F (°C)	30.9 (−0.6)	34.2 (1.2)	41.8 (5.4)	50.1 (10.1)	59.3 (15.2)	67.7 (19.8)	71.2 (21.8)	70.1 (21.2)	62.9 (17.2)	50.9 (10.5)	40.2 (4.6)	33.3 (0.7)	51.0 (10.6)
Mean minimum °F (°C)	16.4 (−8.7)	20.5 (−6.4)	26.6 (−3.0)	36.9 (2.7)	47.2 (8.4)	59.8 (15.4)	65.6 (18.7)	63.8 (17.7)	50.4 (10.2)	37.1 (2.8)	26.4 (−3.1)	20.3 (−6.5)	13.6 (−10.2)
Record low °F (°C)	−8 (−22)	−12 (−24)	11 (−12)	28 (−2)	38 (3)	46 (8)	54 (12)	52 (11)	37 (3)	27 (−3)	10 (−12)	−1 (−18)	−12 (−24)
Average precipitation inches (mm)	3.50 (89)	3.97 (101)	4.96 (126)	5.59 (142)	5.08 (129)	3.55 (90)	3.33 (85)	3.16 (80)	3.01 (76)	4.47 (114)	4.72 (120)	5.08 (129)	50.42 (1,281)
Average snowfall inches (cm)	1.1 (2.8)	1.6 (4.1)	0.5 (1.3)	0.0 (0.0)	0.0 (0.0)	0.0 (0.0)	0.0 (0.0)	0.0 (0.0)	0.0 (0.0)	0.0 (0.0)	0.0 (0.0)	0.6 (1.5)	3.8 (9.7)
Average extreme snow depth inches (cm)	1 (2.5)	1 (2.5)	0 (0)	0 (0)	0 (0)	0 (0)	0 (0)	0 (0)	0 (0)	0 (0)	0 (0)	1 (2.5)	1 (2.5)
Average precipitation days (≥ 0.01 in)	9.2	9.3	10.5	9.4	10.9	8.0	8.7	7.2	6.6	8.1	8.5	9.5	105.9
Average snowy days (≥ 0.1 in)	0.5	0.9	0.4	0.0	0.0	0.0	0.0	0.0	0.0	0.0	0.1	0.3	2.2
Average relative humidity (%)	70.2	68.3	65.4	66.7	71.1	70.0	71.6	71.7	73.5	70.4	71.0	70.9	70.1
Average dew point °F (°C)	28.9 (−1.7)	32.4 (0.2)	40.3 (4.6)	49.6 (9.8)	59.2 (15.1)	66.2 (19.0)	70.2 (21.2)	68.5 (20.3)	63.1 (17.3)	51.1 (10.6)	41.7 (5.4)	32.7 (0.4)	50.3 (10.2)
Mean monthly sunshine hours	180.9	188.2	244.5	276.7	325.3	346.2	351.0	323.0	271.9	251.0	176.9	166.2	3,101.8
Percentage possible sunshine	58	62	66	71	75	80	80	78	73	72	57	54	70
Average ultraviolet index	2.5	3.8	5.7	7.6	8.9	9.6	9.8	8.9	7.2	4.9	3.0	2.3	6.1
Source 1: NOAA (relative humidity and dew point 1961-1990, sun 1961−1990 at North Little Rock Airport)
Source 2: UV Index Today (1995 to 2022)

=== Other data ===
Meteorological Data for the Little Rock Greater Metropolitan Area

Wind speeds during the various months.

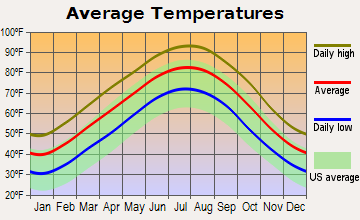
Temperature averages for each month.
