= Neel Shah =

American physician (born 1982)

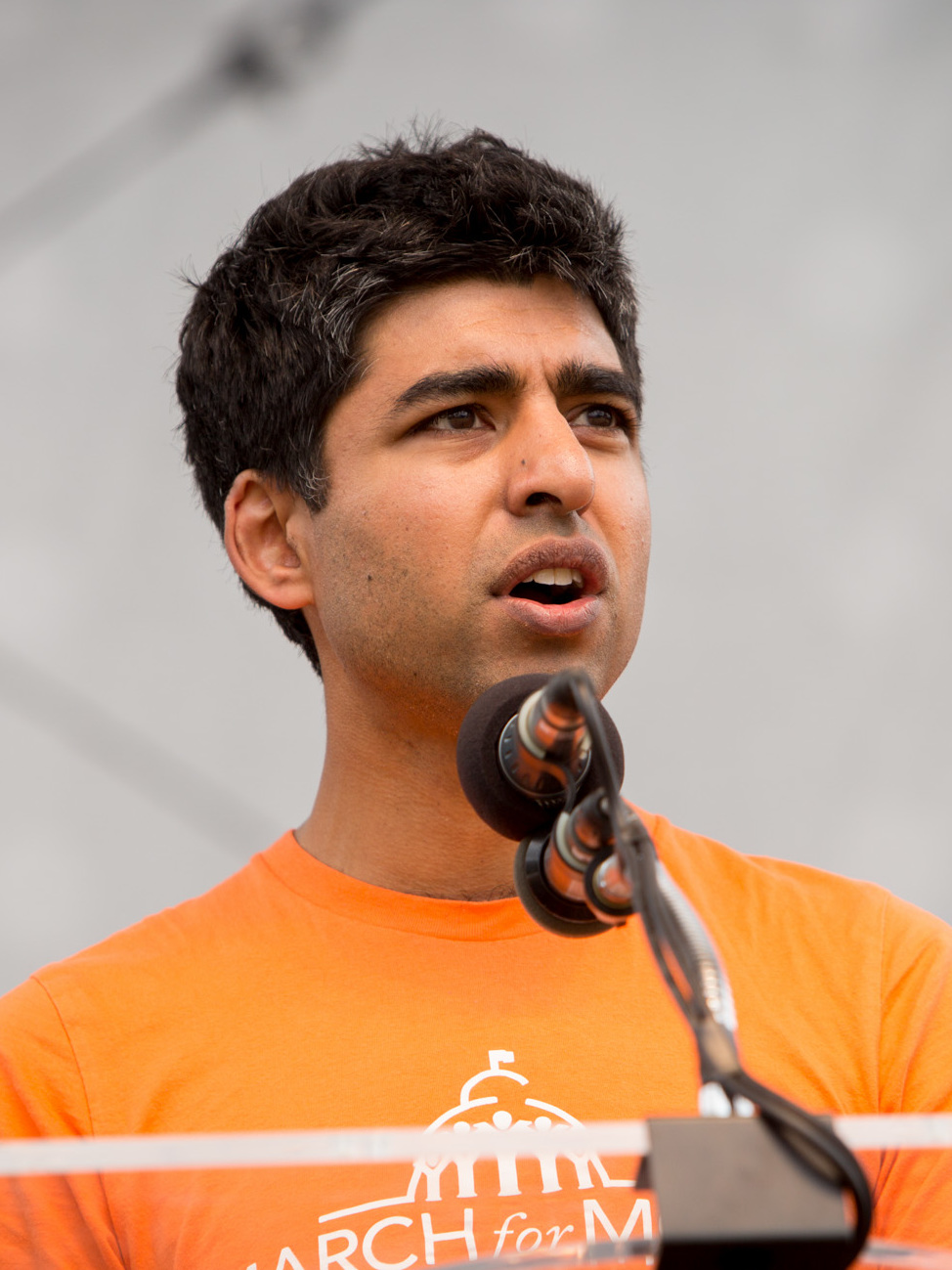
- Neel Shah at 2018 "March for Moms"
- Born: February 23, 1982 (age 44); Bridgeport, Connecticut
- Occupations: Chief Medical Officer, Maven Clinic
- Spouse: Julie Shah

Academic background
- Education: 2004, Sc.B., Brown University, Neuroscience with Honors, 2009; M.P.P., Harvard University, JFK School of Government; 2009, M.D., Brown Medical School

Academic work
- Institutions: Harvard Medical School and Ariadne Labs

Neel Shah (born February 23, 1982) is an American physician, Harvard University assistant professor, Chief Medical Officer of Maven Clinic, and founder of the nonprofit organizations Costs of Care and March for Moms. Shah is married to MIT Professor Julie Shah.

== Early life and education ==
Shah spent his childhood in Hyde Park, New York, and Holmdel Township, New Jersey, where he attended High Technology High School with his future wife Julie Shah, both graduating in 2000. He graduated from Brown University, for his bachelor's degree and medical degrees, and Harvard University for his Master of Public Policy degree. He completed his residency training at Brigham and Women's Hospital and Massachusetts General Hospital. As an undergraduate, his mentor was Nobel Prize winning physicist Leon Cooper, who he credits with teaching him to be an "audacious thinker" about complex systems. Following residency, he joined his mentor Atul Gawande as core faculty at Ariadne Labs, a joint center for health systems innovation between Brigham & Women's Hospital and the Harvard T.H. Chan School of Public Health. He is also an attending physician at Beth Israel Deaconess Medical Center. In 2016, he and his wife Julie were appointed as the Heads of House of the Sidney Pacific graduate community at the Massachusetts Institute of Technology.

== Scholarship ==
Dr. Shah's research focuses on improving maternal health. He founded the Delivery Decisions Initiative at Harvard University's Ariadne Labs to develop solutions to the challenges mothers face during childbirth. He is senior author of the textbook Understanding Value-Based Healthcare and created a framework to ensure value-based healthcare values Black lives. In 2019, he moderated an event at the American College of Obstetricians and Gynecologists on bias in medicine. He has explained how these biases impact mortality rates among Black and Native mothers to the American public through news reports and the Fox television show, "The Resident." According to Dr. Shah, American women today are 50 percent more likely to die in childbirth compared to their own mothers. Dr. Shah has also shown that use of Cesarean sections have increased by 500% in the last generation, and is a national leader in investigating and addressing the causes.

Dr. Shah has demonstrated that hospital management and even hospital architecture can influence Cesarean section rates, and he has developed systems to ensure c-sections are only performed when necessary. Shah has collaborated with his wife Julie to harness artificial intelligence to improve public health, including developing robotic assistants for labor and delivery nurses and approaches to control the spread of the novel coronavirus.

Shah proposed an ethical framework for medicine that includes financial harm to patients under the "do no harm" principle of medical ethics. He participated in a project aiming to collect essays about instances in which inattention to costs has harmed patients — emulating the patient-safety movement's use of anecdotes about sponges left in abdomens or amputations of the wrong limb.

== Nonprofit ==
Dr. Shah founded the nonprofit Costs of Care in 2009 dedicated to providing better healthcare at lower cost. He also founded the nonprofit March for Moms to advance Federal legislation that ensures people can grow their families with dignity. He has been vocal about the dangers of being pregnant and uninsured, and the need to make American health care more affordable in order to address the maternal mortality crisis. He has described the "animating impulse" of both nonprofits as the need for dignity and not just safety in health care.

Shah was featured in a "Doctor and Patient" column in The New York Times by Pauline Chen for creating the Teaching Value Project, aimed at educating doctors about how their decisions impact what patients pay for care. In 2014, Shah was named one of the "40 smartest people in healthcare" by Becker's Hospital Review.

== Maven Clinic ==
In July 2021, Shah was hired by New York City-based telehealth company Maven Clinic as its first Chief Medical Officer. The company offers a virtual care platform for maternal and family health.
