= Lossless convexification =

Exact convex relaxation technique in optimal control

Lossless convexification (often abbreviated LCvx) is a technique in optimal control and mathematical optimization that reformulates certain non-convex optimal control problems into convex optimization problems whose globally optimal solutions are mathematically guaranteed to be feasible and optimal for the original non-convex problem. Unlike general convex relaxations, which typically provide only a lower bound or an approximate solution, a lossless convexification incurs no relaxation gap: solving the convex problem recovers an exact solution to the underlying non-convex problem.

Developed initially at NASA's Jet Propulsion Laboratory (JPL) by Behçet Açıkmeşe, Scott R. Ploen, Lars Blackmore, and John M. Carson III for Mars powered-descent guidance, lossless convexification allows trajectory optimization problems with non-convex control bounds—such as rocket engines with nonzero minimum thrust limits and thrust pointing constraints—to be cast as second-order cone programs (SOCPs) and solved reliably in polynomial time on flight computers. The method formed the mathematical basis for NASA's G-FOLD (Guidance for Fuel-Optimal Large Diverts) algorithm and contributed to real-time onboard guidance for reusable launch vehicles, including SpaceX's Falcon 9 and Falcon Heavy booster landings.

== Motivation ==
Real-time autonomous guidance, navigation, and control (GNC) for powered descent and pinpoint planetary or rocket landing requires computing a fuel-optimal trajectory from the vehicle's current state to a designated landing site while respecting physical and safety constraints. A primary source of non-convexity in such problems is the propulsion system's throttle envelope: a liquid-propellant rocket engine typically cannot be throttled arbitrarily close to zero without shutting down, imposing a nonzero lower bound on thrust magnitude alongside the upper bound:

$$0 < \rho_1 \le \|T(t)\|_2 \le \rho_2$$

Geometrically, this constraint restricts the thrust vector $T(t)$ to a hollow spherical shell (or, in two dimensions, an annulus), which is a non-convex set. Additional non-convexity arises when the thrust vector is also constrained to lie within a pointing cone relative to the local vertical.

General-purpose non-convex optimization algorithms (such as sequential quadratic programming or nonlinear interior-point methods) lack deterministic bounds on convergence time, depend heavily on initial guesses, and can become trapped in local minima or fail to find a feasible solution. These limitations make them unsuitable for safety-critical onboard flight software. By contrast, convex optimization problems—and in particular SOCPs—can be solved to certified global optimality in polynomial time with deterministic runtime bounds using interior-point methods or custom code generators. Lossless convexification bridges the two regimes by transforming the non-convex control constraints into convex ones without sacrificing exactness.

== Mathematical formulation ==
Consider a continuous-time optimal control problem over a fixed horizon $[0, t_f]$ with linear dynamical system

$$\dot{x}(t) = A x(t) + B u(t) + w(t),$$

subject to initial and terminal boundary conditions, convex state constraints, and non-convex control magnitude and pointing constraints:

$$\rho_1 \le \|u(t)\|_2 \le \rho_2, \qquad \hat{n}^\top u(t) \ge \|u(t)\|_2 \cos \theta,$$

where $0 < \rho_1 < \rho_2$, $\hat{n}$ is a unit pointing direction, and $\theta \in [0, \pi)$ is the maximum allowable tilt angle.

=== Convex relaxation ===
Lossless convexification introduces a scalar slack variable $\Gamma(t)$ representing the upper bound on the control norm, and replaces the non-convex constraints with the convex second-order cone and linear inequalities:

$$\|u(t)\|_2 \le \Gamma(t), \qquad \rho_1 \le \Gamma(t) \le \rho_2, \qquad \hat{n}^\top u(t) \ge \Gamma(t) \cos \theta.$$

Where the original objective penalizes control effort $\int_0^{t_f} \|u(t)\|_2 \, dt$ (corresponding to propellant consumption), the relaxed objective instead minimizes $\int_0^{t_f} \Gamma(t) \, dt$. Because all remaining constraints and the objective are convex, the discretized problem is a standard SOCP.

=== Proof of losslessness ===
The relaxation is proven to be lossless using Pontryagin's maximum principle (PMP). Forming the Hamiltonian of the relaxed problem and analyzing the costate equations shows that—under standard controllability and transversality conditions ensuring that the costate vector does not remain orthogonal to the control channel on any interval of positive measure—the optimal control pair $(u^*(t), \Gamma^*(t))$ must lie on the boundary of the cone almost everywhere:

$$\|u^*(t)\|_2 = \Gamma^*(t) \quad \text{almost everywhere on } [0, t_f].$$

Because $\rho_1 \le \Gamma^*(t) \le \rho_2$, this equality implies that $u^*(t)$ automatically satisfies the original non-convex lower bound $\rho_1 \le \|u^*(t)\|_2 \le \rho_2$ and pointing constraint $\hat{n}^\top u^*(t) \ge \|u^*(t)\|_2 \cos \theta$, and achieves the exact global minimum of the original non-convex problem.

=== Variable-mass rocket dynamics ===
In powered-descent guidance for a rocket whose mass $m(t)$ decreases proportionally to thrust magnitude ($\dot{m} = -\alpha \|T(t)\|_2$), the translational dynamics $\ddot{r} = T(t)/m(t) + g$ are coupled nonlinearly to $m(t)$. Açıkmeşe and Ploen (2007) resolved this nonlinearity through a change of variables defining $z(t) = \ln m(t)$, normalized thrust $u(t) = T(t)/m(t)$, and normalized slack variable $\sigma(t) = \Gamma(t)/m(t)$. This transformation renders the dynamics linear in $(r, \dot{r}, z)$ and $(u, \sigma)$, while the thrust-magnitude bounds become convex constraints in $(z, \sigma)$ after a conservative second-order approximation of the exponential term $e^{-z(t)}$.

== Extensions ==
Following the original Mars powered-descent formulation, lossless convexification has been extended to broader classes of optimal control problems:

- Minimum-landing-error guidance: In 2010, Lars Blackmore, Behçet Açıkmeşe, and Daniel P. Scharf extended lossless convexification to cases where disturbances or off-nominal entry conditions make reaching the nominal landing site infeasible. By relaxing the terminal position constraint into the objective, the convex solver computes the trajectory that minimizes landing miss-distance while still satisfying all thrust and physical constraints.
- Pointing constraints: In 2013, Açıkmeşe, Carson, and Blackmore proved that lossless convexification remains valid when non-convex thrust pointing constraints are included alongside annular thrust bounds.
- Nonlinear dynamics: In 2012, Blackmore, Açıkmeşe, and Carson established conditions for lossless convexification of control constraints in a class of nonlinear optimal control problems.
- State-constrained systems: In 2014, Matthew W. Harris and Behçet Açıkmeşe extended the theory to linear systems subject to affine and quadratic state constraints, proving lossless convexification under generalized transversality conditions.
- Sequential convexification: For problems with general nonlinear dynamics, aerodynamic forces, or non-convex obstacle-avoidance constraints that cannot be convexified losslessly in a single solve, lossless convexification is frequently embedded within iterative frameworks such as successive convexification (SCvx) and guaranteed sequential trajectory optimization (GuSTO).

== Applications ==
=== NASA G-FOLD and ADAPT flight tests ===
At NASA JPL, lossless convexification was implemented as the G-FOLD (Guidance for Fuel-Optimal Large Diverts) algorithm for pinpoint Mars landing. Under NASA's Autonomous Descent and Ascent Powered-flight Testbed (ADAPT) project, JPL partnered with Masten Space Systems to demonstrate G-FOLD in closed-loop flight aboard Masten's vertical-takeoff, vertical-landing (VTVL) test rocket Xombie in the Mojave Desert. During flight tests, the onboard SOCP solver computed fuel-optimal trajectories in real time to execute autonomous large divert maneuvers of 550 to 750 meters and achieve precision touchdowns.

=== Reusable orbital rockets ===
Real-time onboard convex optimization and lossless convexification principles played a central role in the development of vertical landing guidance for SpaceX's reusable orbital-class boosters. After joining SpaceX in 2011, Lars Blackmore led the entry, descent, and landing team that adapted onboard convex trajectory optimization—using customized interior-point solvers—to compute precision landing paths in flight for the Falcon 9 and Falcon Heavy first stages, culminating in the first landing of an orbital-class booster on Falcon 9 flight 20 in December 2015. Convex optimization-based guidance has subsequently been applied to next-generation reusable launch vehicles, including SpaceX Starship, as well as lunar lander guidance and spacecraft rendezvous and proximity operations.

== See also ==
- Convex optimization
- Second-order cone programming
- Optimal control
- Pontryagin's maximum principle
- Lars Blackmore
- Behçet Açıkmeşe
- SpaceX reusable launch system development program
