= Susan van den Heever =

South African atmospheric scientist

Susan Claire van den Heever
- Born: South Africa
- Education: Colorado State University; University of the Witwatersrand
- Scientific career
- Workplaces: Colorado State University
- Thesis: The impact of several hail parameters on simulated supercell storms (2001)

Susan Claire van den Heever is a South African atmospheric scientist who is a professor at Colorado State University. Her research considers cloud physics and mesoscale modelling. She is a fellow of the American Meteorological Society and an editor of the Journal of the Atmospheric Sciences.

== Early life and education ==
Originally from South Africa, van den Heever earned her bachelor's degree at the University of the Witwatersrand, where she studied mathematics and physical geography. She remained at the University for a further year, where she completed a higher diploma in education. She then worked as a mathematics teacher at a high school in Johannesburg. She eventually returned to university, where she worked toward a graduate degree in geography. Her master's research involved modelling of tropical-temperate troughs in South Africa. Specifically, she studied El Niño–Southern Oscillation and drought in southern Africa. Subsequently, van den Heever moved to the United States as a doctoral researcher. She completed her PhD at Colorado State University, where she investigated supercell storms. After earning her doctorate, van den Heever worked as a postdoctoral scholar and then research scientist at Colorado State University.

== Research and career ==
In 2008, van den Heever joined the faculty at Colorado State University. She supervises the development of the cloud-resolving numerical model Regional Atmospheric Modeling System. She was named Monfort Professor in 2015 and University Distinguished Professor in 2022. Since 2020 she has also been a Visiting Professor in the Department of Physics at the University of Oxford.

The research that van den Heever conducts primarily focuses on storm systems and the impacts of air pollution on cloud formation. She was part of the NASA Cloud, Aerosol and Monsoon Processes Philippines Experiment (CAMP^{2}Ex), which flew over the oceans close to the Philippines and collected data on the aerosols and cloud microphysics. In 2021, van den Heever was named principal investigator of the NASA Investigation of Cloud Updrafts (INCUS) mission, which is expected to launch in 2027.

== Awards and honours ==
- 2002 NASA Group Achievement Award to CRYSTAL-FACE Science Team
- 2013 Colorado State University Outstanding Professor of the Year Award
- 2015 Colorado State University Outstanding Professor of the Year Award
- 2016 American Geophysical Union ASCENT Award
- 2018 Edward N. Lorenz Teaching Excellence Award
- 2021 Massachusetts Institute of Technology Houghton Lectureship
- 2021 Fellow of the American Meteorological Society

== Selected publications ==
- Susan C. van den Heever; Gustavo G. Carrió; William R. Cotton; Paul J. DeMott; Anthony J. Prenni (July 2006). "Impacts of Nucleating Aerosol on Florida Storms. Part I: Mesoscale Simulations". Journal of the Atmospheric Sciences. 63 (7): 1752–1775. doi:10.1175/jas3713.1. ISSN 0022-4928. Wikidata Q58412063.
- Susan C. van den Heever; William R. Cotton (June 2007). "Urban Aerosol Impacts on Downwind Convective Storms". Journal of Applied Meteorology and Climatology. 46 (6): 828–850. doi:10.1175/jam2492.1. ISSN 1558-8424. Wikidata Q58412061.
- A. P. Khain; K. D. Beheng; A. Heymsfield; et al. (23 May 2015). "Representation of microphysical processes in cloud-resolving models: Spectral (bin) microphysics versus bulk parameterization". Reviews of Geophysics. 53 (2): 247–322. doi:10.1002/2014rg000468. ISSN 8755-1209. Wikidata Q56429403.
