= Imke de Pater =

Planetary scientist

- Education: Rijksuniversiteit te Leiden (Leiden University)
- Scientific career
- Workplaces: University of California, Berkeley
- Thesis: Observations and models of the decimetric radio emission from Jupiter (1980)
- Doctoral students: Katherine de Kleer

Imke de Pater is a Dutch astronomer working at the University of California, Berkeley. She is known for her research on the large planets and led the team using the Keck Telescope to image the 1994 impact of the comet Comet Shoemaker–Levy 9 with Jupiter.

== Education and career ==
De Pater was introduced to astronomy in high school when a family friend gave her an astronomy textbook and introduced her to someone in Utrecht so she could learn about the field. She earned her Ph.D. from Leiden University (1980) while working on radio emissions from Jupiter. de Pater is a professor of astronomy, earth and planetary science from the University of California, Berkeley, and served as the chair of the Astronomy Department.

In 2015 de Pater was named a fellow of the American Geophysical Union who cited her for:

far-seeing discoveries and cutting-edge visions of the dynamic outer solar system made from Earth at nearly every wavelength of light

== Research ==
De Pater's research centers on observations of the large planets and their rings and satellites (Jupiter, Neptune, Titan, and Uranus) using adaptive optics and radio observations. When the Comet Shoemaker–Levy 9 collided with Jupiter in 1994, she led the campaign to observe the impact using the Keck Telescope and the animations of the impact of the comet are readily available to the general public. Her research on the rearrangement of the rings of Uranus indicated they are a dynamic feature of the planet and she revealed the presence of new dust belts surrounding Uranus.

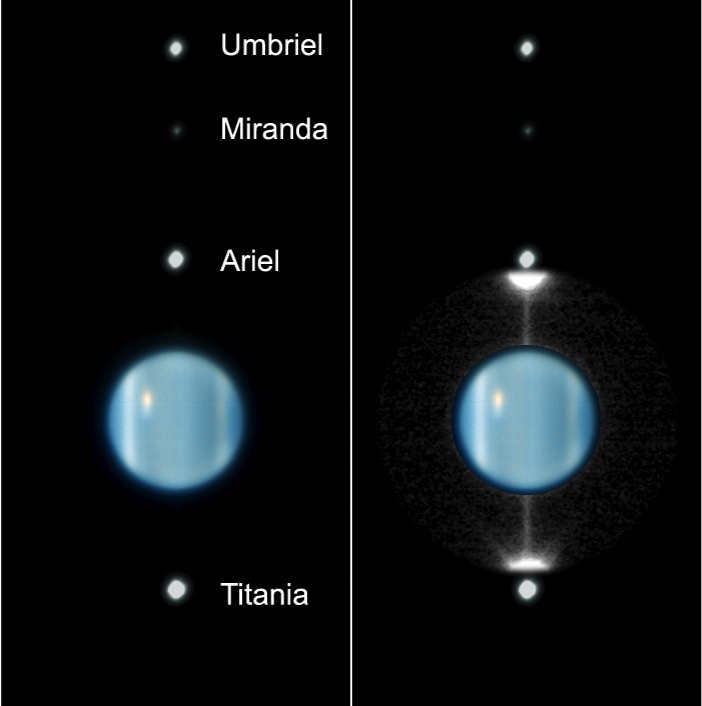
The rings of Uranus are shown here captured almost exactly edge-on to Earth. The observations were done by Daphne Stam (TU Delft) and Markus Hartung (ESO, Chile), in close collaboration with Mark Showalter (SETI) and Imke de Pater (UC Berkeley and TU Delft).

=== Selected publications ===
- de Pater, Imke; Lissauer, Jack J. (2015). Planetary Sciences. Cambridge University Press. ISBN 9781316195697.
- de Pater, Imke; Lissauer, Jack J. (16 September 2013). Fundamental Planetary Science: Physics, Chemistry and Habitability. Cambridge University Press. ISBN 978-0521853309.
- de Pater, I.; Hammel, H. B.; Showalter, M. R.; van Dam, M. A. (28 September 2007). "The Dark Side of the Rings of Uranus". Science. 317 (5846): 1888–1890. Bibcode:2007Sci...317.1888D. doi:10.1126/science.1148103. PMID 17717152. S2CID 23875293.
- de Pater, Imke; Massie, Steven T. (1 April 1985). "Models of the millimeter-centimeter spectra of the giant planets". Icarus. 62 (1): 143–171. Bibcode:1985Icar...62..143D. doi:10.1016/0019-1035(85)90177-0. ISSN 0019-1035.
- Mitchell, David L.; de Pater, Imke (1 July 1994). "Microwave Imaging of Mercury's Thermal Emission at Wavelengths from 0.3 to 20.5 cm". Icarus. 110 (1): 2–32. Bibcode:1994Icar..110....2M. doi:10.1006/icar.1994.1105. ISSN 0019-1035.
- de Pater, I; Heiles, C; Wong, M; Maddalena, R.; Bird, M.; Funke, O; Neidhoefer, J; Price, R.; Kesteven, M; Calabretta, M; Klein, M.; Gulkis, S; Bolton, S.; Foster, R.; Sukumar, S; Strom, R.; LePoole, R.; Spoelstra, T; Robison, M; Hunstead, R.; Campbell-Wilson, D; Ye, T; Dulk, G; Leblanc, Y; Lecacheux, A; et, A. (30 June 1995). "Outburst of Jupiter's synchrotron radiation after the impact of comet Shoemaker-Levy 9". Science. 268 (5219): 1879–1883. Bibcode:1995Sci...268.1879D. doi:10.1126/science.11536723. PMID 11536723.
- de Pater, Imke; Romani, Paul N.; Atreya, Sushil K. (1 June 1991). "Possible microwave absorption by H2S gas in Uranus' and Neptune's atmospheres". Icarus. 91 (2): 220–233. doi:10.1016/0019-1035(91)90020-T. hdl:2027.42/29299. ISSN 0019-1035.
- de Pater, Imke; Kurth, William S. (1 January 2007). "Chapter 38 - The Solar System at Radio Wavelengths". Encyclopedia of the Solar System (2nd ed.). pp. 695–718. doi:10.1016/B978-012088589-3/50042-6. ISBN 9780120885893.

== Awards and honors ==
- C.J. Kok Jury award, Universiteit Leiden (1980)
- John Howard Dellinger Gold Medal, International Union of Radio Science (USRI) (1984)
- Sloan Fellowship (1985)
- Chambliss Astronomical Writing Award for Planetary Astrophysics, American Astronomical Society (2007)
- Fellow, American Geophysical Union (2015)
- Oort lecture, Jan Hendrik Oort Foundation and Leiden Observatory (2007)
