= Lars Blackmore =

British aerospace engineer at SpaceX

- Born: Lars James Blackmore
- Citizenship: United Kingdom
- Education: Trinity College, Cambridge (BA, MEng); Massachusetts Institute of Technology (PhD)
- Known for: Falcon 9 and Falcon Heavy booster landings; SpaceX Starship entry, descent, and landing; Lossless convexification and G-FOLD
- Awards: MIT Technology Review Innovators Under 35 (2015); NAE Gilbreth Lectureship (2017); IEEE Control Systems Technology Award (2021); AIAA F. E. Newbold Award (2023); Member of the National Academy of Engineering (2026); Neil Armstrong Space Prize (2026)
- Scientific career
- Fields: Aerospace engineering, guidance, navigation, and control, convex optimization
- Workplaces: SpaceX (2011–present); Jet Propulsion Laboratory (2007–2011)
- Thesis: Robust Execution for Stochastic Hybrid Systems (2007)
- Doctoral advisor: Brian C. Williams
- Website: larsblackmore.com

Lars James Blackmore is a British aerospace engineer who serves as Senior Principal Mars Landing Engineer at SpaceX, where he leads entry, descent, and landing (EDL) engineering for the SpaceX Starship launch system.

Previously, Blackmore worked in the Guidance and Control Analysis Group at NASA's Jet Propulsion Laboratory (JPL), where he co-invented the G-FOLD (Guidance for Fuel-Optimal Large Diverts) algorithm for precision landing on Mars using convex optimization. After joining SpaceX in 2011 as Principal Rocket Landing Engineer, he led the EDL team responsible for turning the Falcon 9 first stage into a vertically landing reusable launch vehicle, culminating in the first landing and recovery of an orbital-class booster on Falcon 9 flight 20 in December 2015. Since 2018, he has led EDL development for Starship, including the first launch-tower catch of a Starship upper stage returning from orbit on Starship flight 15 in November 2026.

In 2026, Blackmore was elected a member of the National Academy of Engineering for his advances in the guidance and control of reusable rockets and was named an inaugural co-recipient of Purdue University's Neil Armstrong Space Prize.

== Education ==
Blackmore studied engineering at Trinity College, Cambridge, graduating in 2003 with a Bachelor of Arts in engineering (First Class Honours) and a Master of Engineering (MEng) in electrical and information sciences (Distinction), finishing second in his class. While at Cambridge, he received the Royal Academy of Engineering Leadership Award (2001–2003) and the AT&T Cambridge Laboratories Award (2003). His MEng thesis, supervised by Keith Glover, investigated control and estimation for Formula One racing in collaboration with the McLaren team.

In 2003, Blackmore was awarded both a Kennedy Memorial Scholarship and a Fulbright Scholarship to pursue graduate study in the United States at the Massachusetts Institute of Technology (MIT). During his first year at MIT, he also completed a Formula One project with Jaguar Racing (later Red Bull Racing). He earned his PhD in aeronautics and astronautics from MIT in 2007 in the Model-based Embedded and Robotics Systems group under the supervision of Brian C. Williams. His doctoral dissertation, Robust Execution for Stochastic Hybrid Systems, focused on control and estimation of stochastic systems and chance-constrained optimal planning—computing optimal plans subject to a bounded probability of failure.

== Career ==
=== NASA Jet Propulsion Laboratory (2007–2011) ===
Following his PhD, Blackmore joined the Guidance and Control Analysis Group at NASA's Jet Propulsion Laboratory (JPL), part of the California Institute of Technology. At JPL, he developed autonomous control, estimation, and guidance algorithms for future planetary and Earth-science missions, including control algorithms for the Soil Moisture Active Passive (SMAP) satellite, which launched in January 2015, as well as guidance and path-planning studies for a wind-assisted montgolfière balloon on Titan.

With Behçet Açıkmeşe and colleagues at JPL, Blackmore co-invented the G-FOLD (Guidance for Fuel-Optimal Large Diverts) algorithm for precision planetary landing on Mars. Computing fuel-optimal powered-descent trajectories is inherently a non-convex optimization problem due to engine minimum-thrust bounds and pointing constraints, making real-time onboard solutions difficult to guarantee. Blackmore, Açıkmeşe, and their collaborators proved that a convex relaxation of the problem—termed lossless convexification—can be reformulated as a second-order cone program (SOCP) whose globally optimal solution is guaranteed to be optimal for the original non-convex problem and can be computed reliably in real time on flight hardware. They also extended the framework to minimum-landing-error guidance so that a spacecraft can still compute a safe, minimum-miss-distance trajectory when severe disturbances render the nominal target unreachable. Blackmore received the JPL Mariner Award in 2009 and 2010.

=== SpaceX: Falcon 9 and Falcon Heavy (2011–2018) ===
Blackmore joined SpaceX in 2011 as Principal Rocket Landing Engineer, leading the Entry, Descent, and Landing (EDL) engineering team for the Falcon 9 rocket. His team identified the hardware and software changes required to transform the expendable Falcon 9 first stage into a vertically landing, reusable booster. Applying real-time onboard convex optimization and custom flight-code generation, the team developed and tested precision landing guidance, navigation, and control systems across the Grasshopper and F9R Dev test vehicles before deploying them on orbital Falcon 9 and Falcon Heavy missions.

On December 21, 2015, Falcon 9 flight 20 achieved the world's first successful vertical landing and recovery of an orbital-class rocket first stage at Landing Zone 1 in Florida. The precision landing architecture enabled routine recoveries both on land and on autonomous spaceport drone ships at sea, with Falcon 9 boosters surpassing 500 successful landings by 2025.

=== SpaceX: Starship and Mars landing (2018–present) ===
In 2018, Blackmore transitioned to Principal Mars Landing Engineer at SpaceX, and in March 2020 he was promoted to Senior Principal Mars Landing Engineer, leading EDL development for SpaceX Starship. In this role, he oversees the guidance, control, and landing systems for the fully reusable two-stage vehicle designed for high-volume low Earth orbit launches as well as lunar and Martian landings.

Under Blackmore's EDL leadership, SpaceX achieved the first controlled experimental ocean landing of a Starship upper stage returning from space in 2024. Ahead of Starship flight 15 in November 2026, Blackmore appeared in SpaceX's Go for Orbit mission preview and flight coverage to explain the guidance challenges of returning an orbital Starship over North America to Starbase in Texas, noting the 21-minute autonomous over-land phase during which ground operators cannot intervene and the narrow margins of the terminal Raptor landing burn. On November 14, 2026, Ship 42 completed a 22-hour orbital flight and was caught mid-air by the launch tower's mechanical arms at Orbital Launch Pad 2—the first recovery of a Starship upper stage from orbit.

== Selected publications ==
- Blackmore, Lars (2008). Robust Execution for Stochastic Hybrid Systems. VDM Publishing. ISBN 978-3-639-09800-6.
- Blackmore, Lars; Rajamanoharan, S.; Williams, Brian C. (November 2008). "Active Estimation for Jump Markov Linear Systems". IEEE Transactions on Automatic Control. 53 (10): 2223–2236. doi:10.1109/TAC.2008.2006100.
- Blackmore, Lars; Ono, Masahiro; Bektassov, A.; Williams, Brian C. (June 2010). "A Probabilistic Particle Control Approximation of Chance Constrained Stochastic Predictive Control". IEEE Transactions on Robotics. 26 (3): 502–517. doi:10.1109/TRO.2010.2044948. hdl:1721.1/66105.
- Blackmore, Lars; Açıkmeşe, Behçet; Scharf, Daniel P. (July–August 2010). "Minimum-Landing-Error Powered-Descent Guidance for Mars Landing Using Convex Optimization". Journal of Guidance, Control, and Dynamics. 33 (4): 1161–1171. doi:10.2514/1.47202.
- Açıkmeşe, Behçet; Blackmore, Lars (February 2011). "Lossless Convexification of a Class of Optimal Control Problems with Non-Convex Control Constraints". Automatica. 47 (2): 341–347. doi:10.1016/j.automatica.2010.10.037.
- Blackmore, Lars; Ono, Masahiro; Williams, Brian C. (2011). "Chance-Constrained Optimal Path Planning with Obstacles". IEEE Transactions on Robotics. 27 (6): 1080–1094. doi:10.1109/TRO.2011.2161160. hdl:1721.1/80914.
- Blackmore, Lars; Açıkmeşe, Behçet; Carson, John M. III (2012). "Lossless Convexification of Control Constraints for a Class of Nonlinear Optimal Control Problems". Systems & Control Letters. 61 (8): 863–870. doi:10.1016/j.sysconle.2012.04.010.
- Açıkmeşe, Behçet; Carson, John M. III; Blackmore, Lars (2013). "Lossless Convexification of Non-Convex Control Bound and Pointing Constraints of the Soft Landing Optimal Control Problem". IEEE Transactions on Control Systems Technology. 21 (6): 2104–2113. doi:10.1109/TCST.2012.2237346.
- Blackmore, Lars (Winter 2016). "Autonomous Precision Landing of Space Rockets". The Bridge. 46 (4). National Academy of Engineering: 15–20.
- Shotwell, Gwynne; Blackmore, Lars (2021). "Space Launch in 50 Years: Abundance at Last?". The Bridge. 50 (5). National Academy of Engineering: 144–146.

== Awards and honors ==
- 2026: Inaugural co-recipient of the Neil Armstrong Space Prize (awarded by Purdue University to the SpaceX Falcon 9 Booster Landing Team alongside Shana Diez, Jon Edwards, Yoshiaki Kuwata, and Eduardo Velazquez)
- 2026: Elected Member of the National Academy of Engineering (Aerospace Engineering section), cited "for advances in the field of guidance and control of reusable rockets"
- 2023: AIAA F. E. Newbold V/STOL Award, for outstanding creative contributions to the advancement and realization of powered lift flight
- 2021: IEEE Control Systems Technology Award (co-recipient with Yoshiaki Kuwata), "for developing the guidance, navigation and control for the Falcon 9 and Falcon Heavy reusable rockets"
- 2017: National Academy of Engineering Gilbreth Lectureship
- 2016: IEEE Spectrum Emerging Technology Award (group award)
- 2016: National Space Society Space Pioneer Award (group award)
- 2015: MIT Technology Review Innovators Under 35 (Visionaries category)
- 2009, 2010: NASA Jet Propulsion Laboratory Mariner Award
- 2006: AIAA Guidance, Navigation, and Control Conference Best Student Paper Award, and AIAA Guidance, Navigation, and Control Graduate Award
- 2003: Kennedy Memorial Scholarship, Fulbright Scholarship, and AT&T Cambridge Laboratories Award
- 2001–2003: Royal Academy of Engineering Leadership Award

== Media appearances ==
Blackmore has appeared in documentaries and television series covering commercial spaceflight and Mars exploration, including the 2022 Netflix documentary Return to Space, National Geographic's Mars, and the Science Channel's Man vs. the Universe.

== See also ==
- Behçet Açıkmeşe
- SpaceX reusable launch system development program
- Falcon 9
- SpaceX Starship
- Starship flight 15
