= Julie Shah =

American aerospace engineer

- Born: 1982 (age 43–44) (Note: In 2014, Shah was reported to be 32 years old); New Jersey, USA
- Spouse: Neel Shah

Academic background
- Education: S.M., 2006, PhD, 2011, Massachusetts Institute of Technology
- Thesis: Fluid coordination of human-robot teams (2011)

Julie Shah (née Arnold) is the Department Head of Aeronautics and Astronautics at the Massachusetts Institute of Technology and director of the Interactive Robotics Group at the MIT Computer Science and Artificial Intelligence Laboratory.

== Early life and education ==
Shah was born and raised in Holmdel Township, New Jersey, where she attended High Technology High School in Lincroft, New Jersey, with her future husband Neel Shah. She attended Massachusetts Institute of Technology (MIT) for her Bachelor of Science, Master's degree and PhD.

== Career ==
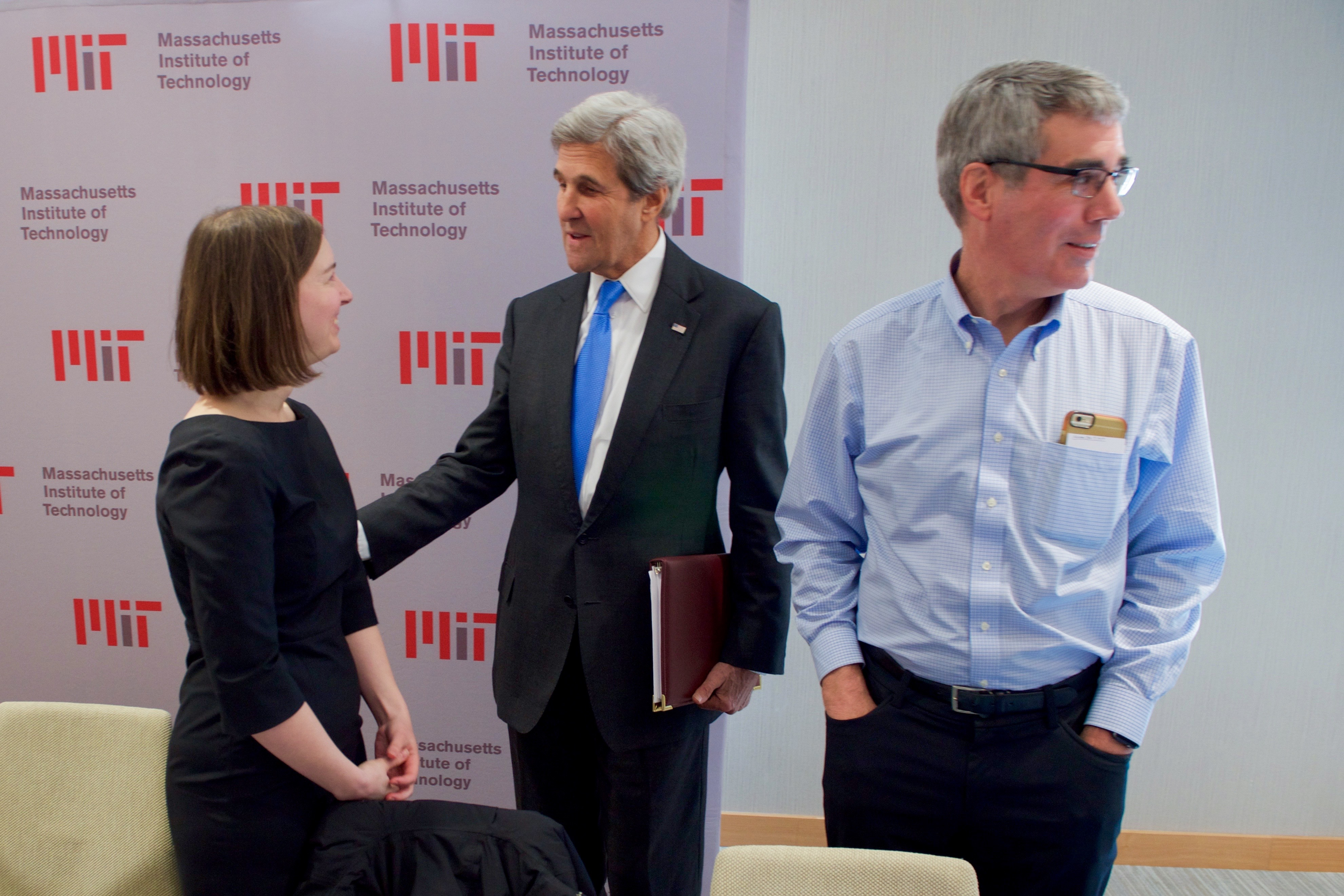
Shah (left) with Secretary of State John Kerry and Bill Aulet.

Upon completing her doctoral degree, Shah was immediately offered an assistant professor position in MIT’s Department of Aeronautics and Astronautics (AeroAstro). Prior to accepting the role, she was encouraged to spend an academic year away from MIT as a postdoctoral fellow with Boeing Research and Technology in Seattle to develop real-world applications. In her first year as an assistant professor, Shah co-taught a course called Real Time Systems and Software and co-founded the Interactive Robotics Group at MIT Computer Science and Artificial Intelligence Laboratory (CSAIL). With her graduate students Matthew Gombolay and Ronald Wilcox, Julie Shah proposed Tercio, a satisficing task sequencer drawing on processor scheduling analogies, and demonstrated across randomly generated factory problems that it achieved near-optimal makespans at scales previously intractable for existing methods. With her graduate student Stefanos Nikolaidis, Shah proposed cross-training, a role-switching technique inspired by human team training, and showed empirically that it outperformed scalar reward feedback for learning human preferences. By 2014, Shah collaborated with graduate student Been Kim and associate professor of statistics Cynthia Rudin to augment unsupervised machine learning in computers. As a result of her efforts, she was recognized by the MIT Technology Review TR35 list as one of the world’s top innovators under the age of 35.

During her time at MIT, Shah continued her research on human-robot collaboration and transition of results to real world applications. As a result, she became a 2016–17 Perrin Moorhead Grayson and Bruns Grayson Fellow at Harvard University's Radcliffe Institute for Advanced Study. Upon returning to MIT, Shah earned the 2018 Early Academic Career Award in Robotics and Automation from the IEEE Robotics and Automation Society. In 2019, she received tenure from the Massachusetts Institute of Technology School of Engineering as their Boeing Career Development Professor in the Department of Aeronautics and Astronautics. In 2020 she co-authored What to Expect When You're Expecting Robots with entrepreneur Laura Major.
