= UC Berkeley College of Computing, Data Science, and Society =

Unit of the University of California, Berkeley

- Type: Public
- Established: 2023
- Affiliations: University of California, Berkeley
- Location: Berkeley, United States
- Website: https://data.berkeley.edu/

The College of Computing, Data Science, and Society is the newest of the 15 colleges at the University of California, Berkeley and has three academic majors: Computer Science, Data Science, and Statistics. The college was established in 2023. The 2023–24 academic year was the first academic year for the college.
