= Katherine de Kleer =

American planetary scientist

Katherine Rebecca de Kleer is an American planetary scientist whose research concerns the surfaces, atmospheres, and internal heating of planetary bodies, and especially the volcanoes on Jupiter's moon Io. She is a professor of planetary science and astronomy and Hufstedler Family Scholar at the California Institute of Technology.

== Education and career ==
De Kleer writes that she "always loved the stars as a kid", and that her interest deepened when her father (computer scientist Johan de Kleer) taught her to use a telescope. She became a double major in mathematics and physics, with a minor in astronomy, at the Massachusetts Institute of Technology, and graduated with two bachelor's degrees in 2009. Continuing her studies in astrophysics at the University of California, Berkeley, she received a master's degree in 2013 and completed her Ph.D. in 2017. Her doctoral dissertation, Extreme worlds of the outer Solar System: Dynamic processes on Uranus & Io, was supervised by Imke de Pater.

She joined the California Institute of Technology as a Heising-Simons Foundation 51 Pegasi b Postdoctoral Fellow from 2017 to 2019, and became a regular-rank assistant professor there in 2019. She was named a Hufstedler Family Scholar in 2022 and promoted to full professor in 2026.

== Recognition ==
De Kleer was the 2024 recipient of the Harold C. Urey Prize of the Division for Planetary Sciences of the American Astronomical Society. She was also a 2024 recipient of the Cottrell Scholar Awards of the Research Corporation.
