= NASA Group Achievement Award =

Award presented by NASA

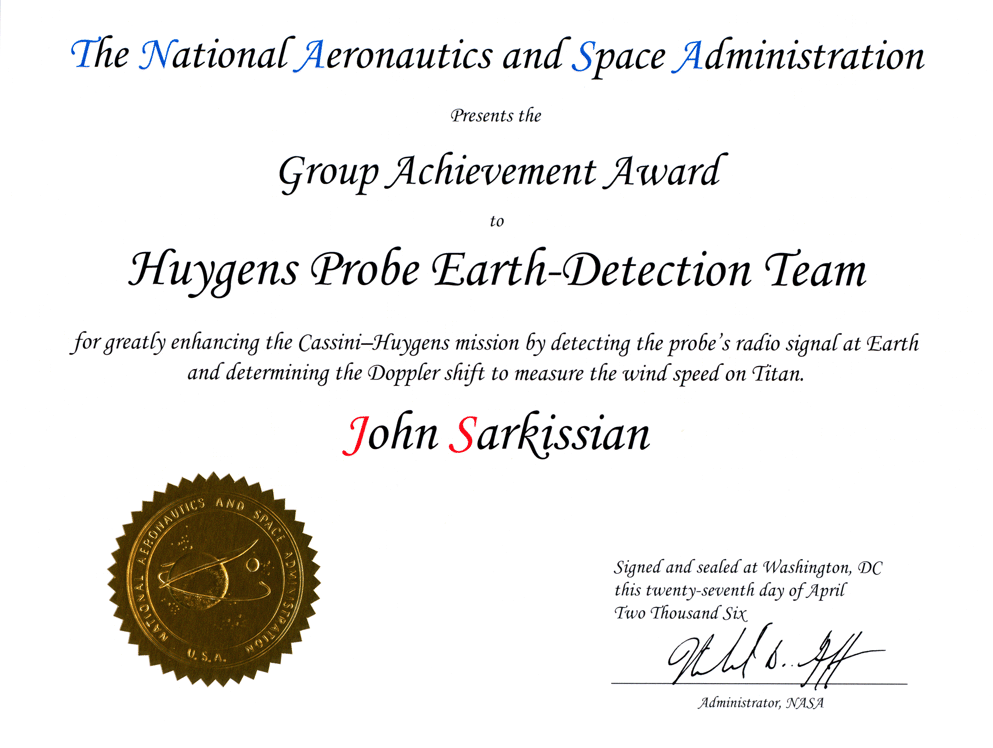
- Group Achievement Award certificate presented to the Huygens probe Earth-detection team
- Awarded for: "Outstanding group accomplishment that has contributed substantially to NASA's mission"
- Country: United States
- Presented by: the National Aeronautics and Space Administration
- Eligibility: Any combination of government and/or non-government individuals
- Status: Active

The NASA Group Achievement Award (GAA) is an award given by NASA to groups of government or non-government personnel in recognition of group accomplishments contributing to NASA's mission. The criteria for earning the Group Achievement Award are:

1. The quality of results and the Agency or multi-Center level of impact on programs or operations;
2. Effective management of cost and schedule;
3. Customer satisfaction;
4. Team growth and capacity for future contribution (Government personnel only); and
5. Additional credit for development of innovative approaches, use of and contributions to lessons-learned data banks, and/or
6. Success in responding to unforeseen crises.

== 2022 ==
Automated Reconfigurable Mission Adaptive Digital Assembly Systems (ARMADAS) Team

== 2021 ==
Rodent Research Team

== 2020 ==
The Cross-System Search Development Team

== 2019 ==
Connected Autonomous Smart Aerospace Systems (CASAS) Team

Mission Assurance Systems (MAS) Team

Task Load Index (TLX) Team

Airspace Technology Demonstration 2 (ATD-2) Integrated Arrival, Departure, and Surface (IADS) Field Demonstration Team

Discovery and Systems Health link (DaSHlink) Team

Formal Requirements Elicitation Tool (FRET) Team

Lunar Rover Navigation Team

Heatshield for Extreme Entry Environment Technology (HEEET) Development Team

Adaptive, Deployable Entry and Placement Technology (ADEPT) SR-1 Team

== 2018 ==
Exploratory Medical Capabilities (ExMC) Medical Data Architecture Team

Fatigue App Development Team

Unmanned Aircraft Systems (UAS) Detect and Avoid Team

Autonomous Systems and Operations (ASO) Project Autonomous Habitat Demonstration Team

Autonomy Operating System for Unmanned Aerial Vehicles (UAVs) Team

Life-detection Mars Analog Project (LMAP) Team

Machine-Learning and Data Sciences Team

Mission Adaptive Digital Composite Aerostructure Technologies (MADCAT) Team

NASA-Nissan Partnership Team

Rodent Research Team

Stall Recovery Guidance Team

Systems-Health and Operations Open-Data Team

Terrestrial Exoplanet Survery Satellite (TESS) Science Processing Operations Center (SPOC) Commissioning Team

Asteroid Threat Assessment Project (ATAP) Team

Orion Laser Enhanced Arc Jet Facility (LEAF) Lite Project Team

== See also ==
- List of NASA awards
