= Nancy Crooker =

American astrophysicist

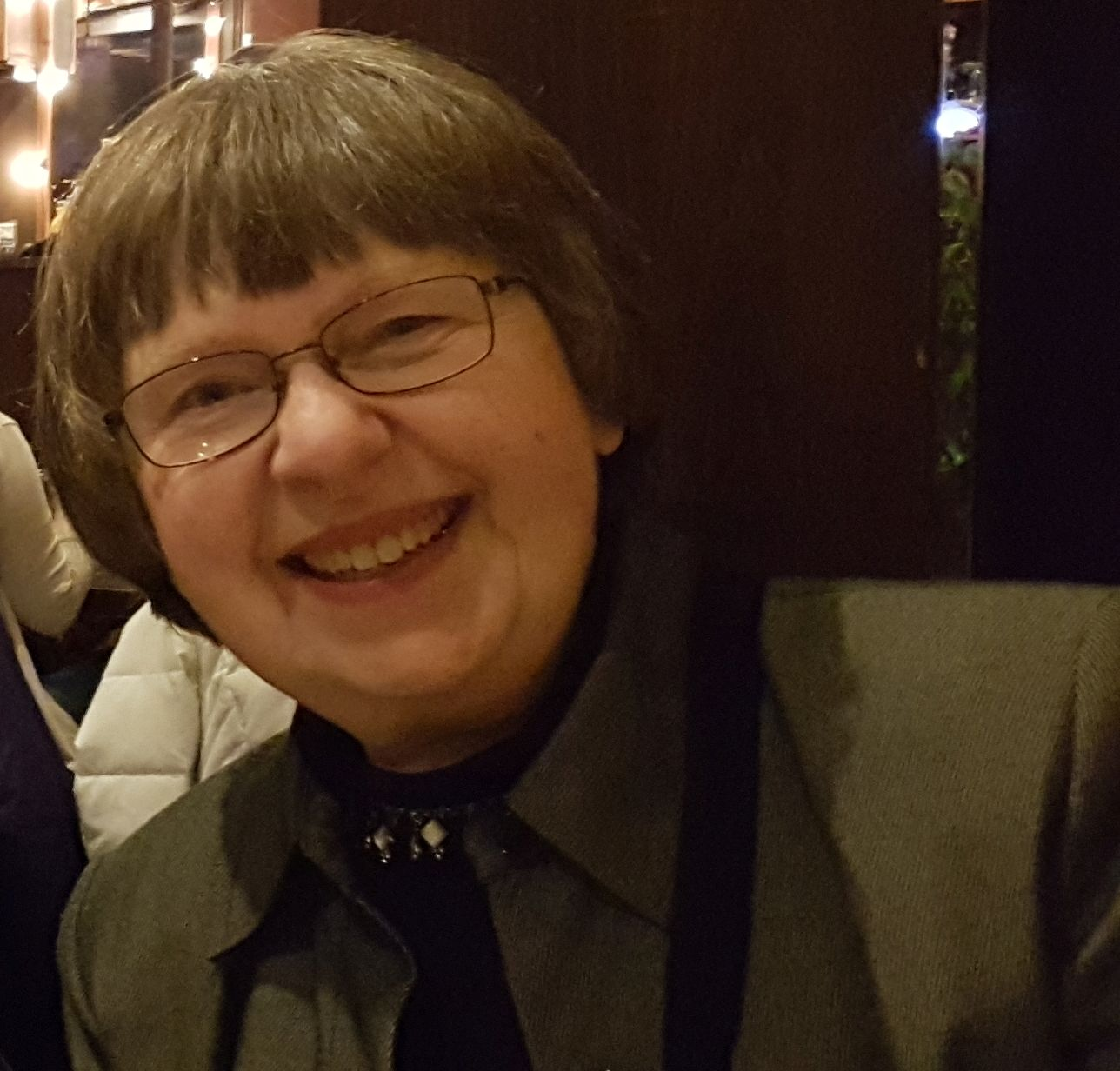
- Born: April 1, 1944 (age 82); Chicago, USA
- Citizenship: United States
- Education: University of California, Los Angeles
- Occupation: Researcher
- Employer: Boston University

Nancy U. Crooker (born April 1, 1944) is an American physicist and professor emerita of space physics at Boston University, Massachusetts. She has made major contributions to the understanding of geomagnetism in the Earth's magnetosphere and the heliosphere, particularly through the study of interplanetary electrons and magnetic reconnection.

== Early life and education ==
Crooker was born in Chicago in 1944. Her father, Michael Uss, a Lithuanian who emigrated to America as a child, was a foreman at the freight yards of the Chicago & Northwestern Railroad, and her mother, Helen Narovec, was a housewife.

Crooker holds a BA in physics from Knox College, Illinois, and an MSc in Meteorology from the University of California, Los Angeles (UCLA). In 1972 Crooker was awarded her PhD in Atmospheric Sciences, also from UCLA, with her doctoral dissertation entitled, "The Low-Latitude Asymmetric Disturbance in the Geomagnetic Field".

== Research career ==
Crooker has published 207 peer-reviewed articles (as of 8 October 2019) across a range of topics within space physics. Her early career was as a postdoctoral researcher at Cornell University and then the Massachusetts Institute of Technology in the 1970s. There, together with Joan Feynman in their seminal Nature paper, she was one of the first physicists to use geomagnetic data as a way to reconstruct solar activity prior to the space age. Crooker then developed the concept of anti-parallel merging of magnetic field lines in Earth's magnetosphere published in Journal of Geophysical Research in 1979.

In 1990, she returned to UCLA as an adjunct professor before making her final move to Boston University as a research professor in 1994. Around this time, Crooker switched focus from the magnetosphere to the heliosphere, in particular the interplanetary manifestations of coronal mass ejections. In 1997, she co-edited a monograph on coronal mass ejections. In 2002, she coined the term "interchange reconnection" for describing the dynamic process by which heliospheric magnetic flux introduced by coronal mass ejections is subsequently removed, a term which has been comprehensively adopted in the field.

Crooker was president of the American Geophysical Union (AGU) Space Physics & Aeronomy Section from 2004 to 2006. She is a fellow of the American Geophysical Union, where the fellowship program recognizes AGU members who have made exceptional contributions to Earth and space science through a breakthrough, discovery, or innovation in their field. She also received the Eugene Parker Lecture award from the AGU in 2013, only the third woman to do so.

She has worked closely over decades with several other prominent space physicists, including John T. Gosling, Marcia Neugebauer, Mike Lockwood, Chris Russell and Thomas Zurbuchen.

== Scientific Citizenship ==
Crooker has served on numerous committees, panels and taskforces throughout her career, including:

- AGU Fellows Program Review Task Force (2015)
- Founding member of the new executive board for the American Geophysical Union (2010)
- Media panel member for the NASA Ulysses spacecraft media telecon (2008)
- Working group leader, International Space Science Institute (ISSI) workshop on Co-rotating Interaction Regions (1998)
- Interviewed by CNN about solar storms (1997)
- Chair, AGU Awards Committee for Solar-Planetary Relations Section (1988-1990)

== Awards and honors ==
- The Eugene Parker Lecture is presented two out of every three years to a space scientist who has made significant contributions to the fields of solar and heliospheric science by the American Geophysical Union. Crooker received this honor in 2013.
- President of the AGU Space Physics & Aeronomy Section (2004 to 2006)
- Member of the Solar Heliospheric and Interplanetary Environment (SHINE) Steering Committee (1995-2002)
- Solar Heliospheric Secretary for Space Physics & Aeronomy Section of AGU (2000-2002)
- Fellow of the American Geophysical Union (2000)
- Member of the NASA Magnetospheric Management Operations Working Group (1995-6)
- Editor's Citation for Excellence in Refereeing for the Journal of Geophysical Research (1993) and Geophysical Research Letters (1996)
