= Nicholeen =

Nicholeen is a feminine given name. Notable people with the name include:

- Nicholeen P. Peck, American politician
- Nicholeen Viall, American solar physicist

== See also ==
- Nicole (name)
- Nichol
- Nicholine
