= Katharine Reeves =

Astronomer

Katharine Reeves is an astronomer and solar physicist who works at the Center for Astrophysics | Harvard & Smithsonian (CfA). She is known for her work on high temperature plasmas in the solar corona, and measurement/analysis techniques to probe the physics of magnetic reconnection and thermal energy transport during solar flares; these are aspects of the coronal heating problem that organizes a large part of the field. She has a strong scientific role in multiple NASA and international space missions to observe the Sun: Hinode (Project Scientist for the XRT instrument); IRIS (Institutional PI for SAO); SDO; Parker Solar Probe; and suborbital sounding rockets including the MaGIXS and Hi-C FLARE high-resolution spectral imaging packages.

Reeves has advised multiple graduate students and post-doctoral scholars in the field of solar physics, including Samaiyah Farid, Xie Xiaoyan, Nishu Karna, and Soumya Roy.

== Education ==
- B.A., Reed College
- M.S., Northeastern University
- Ph.D., University of New Hampshire

== Awards and honors ==
In 2016, Reeves was awarded the prestigious Karen Harvey Prize by the American Astronomical Society's Solar Physics Division, in recognition of her significant contributions to the study of the sun in her early career.

== Publications ==
Notable scientific publications include:

- Reeves, Katharine K.; Golub, Leon (2011-01-01). "Atmospheric Imaging Assembly Observations of Hot Flare Plasma". The Astrophysical Journal Letters 727 (2): L52. doi:10.1088/2041-8205/727/2/L52. ISSN 2041-8205.
- Reeves, Katharine K.; Linker, Jon A.; Mikić, Zoran; Forbes, Terry G. (2010-01-01). "Current Sheet Energetics, Flare Emissions, and Energy Partition in a Simulated Solar Eruption". The Astrophysical Journal 721(2): 1547. doi:10.1088/0004-637X/721/2/1547. ISSN 0004-637X.
- Reeves, Katharine K.; Moats, Stephanie J. (2010-01-01). "Relating Coronal Mass Ejection Kinematics and Thermal Energy Release to Flare Emissions using a Model of Solar Eruptions". The Astrophysical Journal 712(1): 429. doi:10.1088/0004-637X/712/1/429. ISSN 0004-637X.
- Reeves, K. K.; Guild, T. B.; Hughes, W. J.; Korreck, K. E.; Lin, J.; Raymond, J.; Savage, S.; Schwadron, N. A.; Spence, H. E. (2008-09-01)."Posteruptive phenomena in coronal mass ejections and substorms: Indicators of a universal process?". Journal of Geophysical Research: Space Physics 113 (A9): A00B02.doi:10.1029/2008JA013049. ISSN 2156-2202.
- Reeves, Seaton & Forbes, "Field Line Shrinkage in Flares Observed by the X-Ray Telescope on Hinode," ApJ, 675, 2008.
- Reeves, Warren & Forbes, "Theoretical Predictions of X-Ray and Extreme-UV Flare Emissions Using a Loss-of-Equilibrium Model of Solar Eruptions," ApJ, 668, 2007.
