= Viall =

Viall is a surname. Notable people with the surname include:

- Charlotte Viall Wiser (1892–1981), American anthropologist
- Edward J. Viall (c. 1890–1950), American politician
- Kenneth Viall (1893–1974), American Anglican bishop
- Nicholeen Viall, American solar physicist
- Nick Viall (born 1980), American actor, television personality and model
