= Arctowski Medal =

The Arctowski Medal is awarded by the U.S. National Academy of Sciences "for studies in solar physics and solar-terrestrial relationships." Named in honor of Henryk Arctowski, it was first awarded in 1969.

== List of Arctowski Medal winners ==
Source: NAS

- Stuart D. Bale (2025) - For fundamental contributions to our understanding of the physics of the solar corona and the solar wind.
- David J. McComas (2023) - For pioneering contributions to experimental space physics.
- Dana W. Longcope (2021) - For fundamental research on the nature of solar magnetism, magnetic topology, and reconnection, providing a unified framework for understanding the energization and dynamics of quiet sun, active regions, flares, and coronal mass ejections.
- Michelle F. Thomsen (2019) - For her fundamental contributions to our understanding of the relationships between the sun and its planetary bodies, with a particular emphasis on the physics of collisionless shocks and the dynamics of the planetary magnetospheres of Earth, Jupiter, and Saturn.
- Mats Carlsson and Viggo Hansteen (2017) - For their investigations in radiative transfer, magneto-hydro-dynamics, and plasma physics that has resulted in major advances in chromospheric diagnostics and our understanding of the physical mechanisms that drive chromospheric and coronal dynamics and energetics through the development and use of the Bifrost numerical model of the sun's atmosphere.
- Alexander J. Dessler (2015) - For his notable imagination in framing many of space science's most basic conceptions about the solar wind and interplanetary magnetic field and their interactions with the magnetospheres of Earth and other planets at the beginning of the Space Age.
- John T. Gosling (2013) - For elucidating fundamental issues in the physics of the solar atmosphere and solar wind, including revealing the "Solar Flare Myth", discovering bi-directional solar-electron streaming and, in the last decade, finding reconnection events in the solar wind.
- John W. Harvey (2011) - For major contributions to understanding the sun's magnetic fields and its interior structure, and for developing the instrumentation that has made these discoveries possible.
- Marcia Neugebauer (2010) - For definitively establishing the existence of the solar wind, critical to understanding the physics of the heliosphere, and for elucidating many of its key properties.
- Leonard F. Burlaga (2008) - For pioneering studies of the magnetized solar wind plasma from 0.3 to 102 AU, including the recent crossings of the Voyagers of the heliospheric termination shock and their entry in the heliosheath.
- Edward J. Smith (2005) - For his pioneering studies of the solar and heliospheric magnetic fields in deep space and planetary magnetic fields and their interaction with the solar wind.
- Roger K. Ulrich (2002) - For recognizing the solar five-minute oscillations as acoustic modes in the solar interior and systematically developing both the theory and the observations to establish today's precise standard model of the solar interior.
- Arthur J. Hundhausen (1999) - For his exceptional research in solar and solar-wind physics, particularly in the area of coronal and solar wind disturbances.
- Raymond G. Roble (1996) - For his indispensable contributions to understanding the effects of variable solar inputs on the Earth's atmosphere and ionosphere by powerful global modeling techniques.
- John A. Simpson (1993) - For his pioneering studies of the properties of the charged particle environment of the Sun, the Earth, and the other planets.
- Peter A. Sturrock (1990) - For major contributions to the understanding of the solar magnetic activity, especially with regard about the genesis and effect of solar flares.
- John A. Eddy (1987) - For his demonstration of the existence and nature of solar variations of long-term and the consequences of these changes for climate and mankind.
- William E. Gordon (1984) - For his pioneering development of theory and instrumentation for radar backscatter studies, which opened a broad field of research in the high altitude ionosphere.
- Thomas M. Donahue (1981) - For his fundamental contributions to understanding the role of solar radiation in the physics and chemistry of the atmospheres and ionosphere of the Earth, Mars, and Venus.
- John R. Winckler (1978) - For his outstanding research on the solar modulation and acceleration of high energy particles and the discoveries of solar flare gamma rays and auroral X-rays.
- Jacques M. Beckers (1975) - For his extraordinary originality and achievement in the discovery and study of exotic small-scale phenomena in the Sun.
- Francis S. Johnson (1972) - For his pioneering work in the physics of the high atmosphere and space.
- Eugene N. Parker (1969) - For his comprehensive and imaginative contributions to the theoretical understanding of plasma interactions with the solar and terrestrial magnetic fields.
- J. Paul Wild (1969) - In recognition of his many and comprehensive contributions to solar radio astronomy.

== See also ==
- List of physics awards
- Prizes named after people
