= Sarah Gibson =

Sarah Gibson may refer to:

- Sarah Gibson Humphreys (1830–1907), American author and suffragist
- Sarah Gibson Blanding (1898–1985), American educator and academic administrator
- Sarah Gibson (filmmaker), Australian filmmaker, involved with the 1975 International Women's Film Festival
- Sarah Gibson (politician) (born 1966), British MP
- Sarah Gibson (composer) (1986–2024), American pianist and composer.
- Sarah E. Gibson (21st century), American solar physicist
- Sarah Gibson (swimmer) (born 1995), American swimmer
