= George H. Ludwig =

American space scientist

- Born: November 13, 1927; Sharon Center, Iowa
- Died: January 22, 2013 (aged 85); Winchester, Virginia
- Education: University of Iowa
- Known for: First space instruments that discovered Van Allen radiation belts
- Awards: NASA Exceptional Service and Exceptional Scientific Achievement Medals
- Scientific career
- Fields: Space scientist
- Workplaces: University of Iowa; NASA; NOAA
- Doctoral advisor: James Van Allen

George H. Ludwig was the former chief research scientist for the National Aeronautics and Space Administration's satellite systems and director of operations for the National Oceanic and Atmospheric Administration. He played a key role in adapting solid-state scientific research instruments for America's first satellites: Explorer I, II, and III. He wrote a book, and provided audio/oral history with the Transistor Museum.

== Goddard Space Flight Center ==
Upon completing his doctorate in 1960, from the University of Iowa, Dr. Ludwig joined the Goddard Space Flight Center (GSFC) in Greenbelt, MD as chief of the new fields and particles instrumentation section. The Goddard Space Flight Center (GSFC) was established on May 1, 1959, as NASA's first space flight center and research laboratory. Its first 157 employees were transferred from the United States Navy's Project Vanguard, but continued their work at the Naval Research Laboratory in Washington, D.C., while the center was under construction.

Dr. Ludwig served as Project Scientist for NASA's Orbiting Geophysical Observatory 1, 3 and 5, nicknamed "Street-Car", which carried more than 60 instruments to conduct a wide variety of space science investigations.

== NOAA ==
In 1972, Dr. Ludwig joined the National Oceanic and Atmospheric Administration, which was created in 1970. Over the next ten years working in Washington, D.C., and Boulder, Colorado, he directed the design, construction, and check-out of the Television Infrared Observation Satellite TIROS-N/NOAA polar-orbiting satellite system and many of the evolutionary improvements to the Geostationary Operational Environmental Satellite (GOES) system.

== NASA ==
Dr. Ludwig returned to NASA as the Assistant Chief Scientist, NASA, Washington, D.C. He directed a critical examination of NASA space research data management. He retired in 1984.

== Consulting and writing ==
Dr. Ludwig led efforts to define the data and information systems for the Global Change Research Program and early-Earth Observing System. In 2004, on James Van Allen Day, in celebration of Dr. Van Allen's 90th birthday celebration, Dr. Ludwig presented a lecture on his contributions with the Iowa Group in the 1950s. He finished the book, Opening Space Research; Dreams, Technology, and Scientific Discovery, published by American Geophysical Union, shortly before his death.

== Death ==
George H. Ludwig, 85, died of prostate cancer January 22, 2013, at his home in Winchester, Virginia.
