= Karen Harvey Prize =

The Karen Harvey Prize is awarded by the American Astronomical Society's Solar Physics Division in recognition for a significant contribution to the study of the Sun early in a person's professional career.

Past winners are:

- 2003 Dana Longcope
- 2004 Harry Warren
- 2005 Sarah E. Gibson
- 2006 Steven R Cranmer
- 2007 Jiong Qiu
- 2008 Mark G. Linton
- 2009 Laurent Gizon
- 2010 Brian Welsch
- 2011 Mathias Rempel
- 2012 Dibyendu Nandi
- 2013 Tibor Torok
- 2014 Alexis Rouillard
- 2015 Jonathan Cirtain
- 2016 Katharine Reeves
- 2017 Mark Cheung
- 2018 Nicholeen Viall
- 2019 Anthony Yeates
- 2020 Hui Tian
- 2021 Lucia Kleint
- 2022 Adam Kowalski
- 2023 Bin Chen
- 2024 Kristopher G. Klein
- 2025 Lisa Upton
- 2026 Lakshmi Pradeep Chitta

== See also ==
- List of astronomy awards
