= George Ellery Hale Prize =

The George Ellery Hale Prize, or Hale Prize, is awarded annually by the Solar Physics Division of the American Astronomical Society for outstanding contributions over an extended period of time to the field of solar astronomy. The prize is named in memory of George Ellery Hale.

Past winners of the Hale Prize are:

- 1978 Eugene N. Parker
- 1980 John Paul Wild
- 1982 John W. Evans
- 1984 Leo Goldberg
- 1986 Peter A. Sturrock
- 1988 Cornelis de Jager
- 1990 Richard N. Tousey
- 1992 Horace W. Babcock
- 1994 Douglas O. Gough
- 1996 Raymond Davis Jr.
- 1998 Richard B. Dunn
- 1999 John W. Harvey
- 2000 Loren W. Acton
- 2001 Alan M. Title
- 2002 Eric Priest
- 2003 Robert F. Howard
- 2004 Robert P. Lin
- 2005 Spiro Antiochos
- 2006 Peter A. Gilman
- 2007 Mukul R. Kundu
- 2008 Hugh S. Hudson
- 2009 Neil R. Sheeley Jr.
- 2010 Marcia Neugebauer
- 2011 Henk Spruit (astrophysicist)
- 2012 Don Reames
- 2013 Richard Canfield
- 2014 Thomas Duvall, Jr.
- 2015 George Doschek
- 2016 Terry G. Forbes
- 2017 Manfred Schüssler
- 2018 Sarbani Basu
- 2019 Phil Scherrer
- 2020 Kazunari Shibata
- 2021 Russell A. Howard
- 2022 Sami Solanki
- 2023 George Fisher
- 2024 Judith Lean
- 2025 James Klimchuk
- 2026 Yi-Ming Wang

== See also ==
- List of astronomy awards
- Prizes named after people
