= Judith Lean =

Australian-American solar and climate scientist

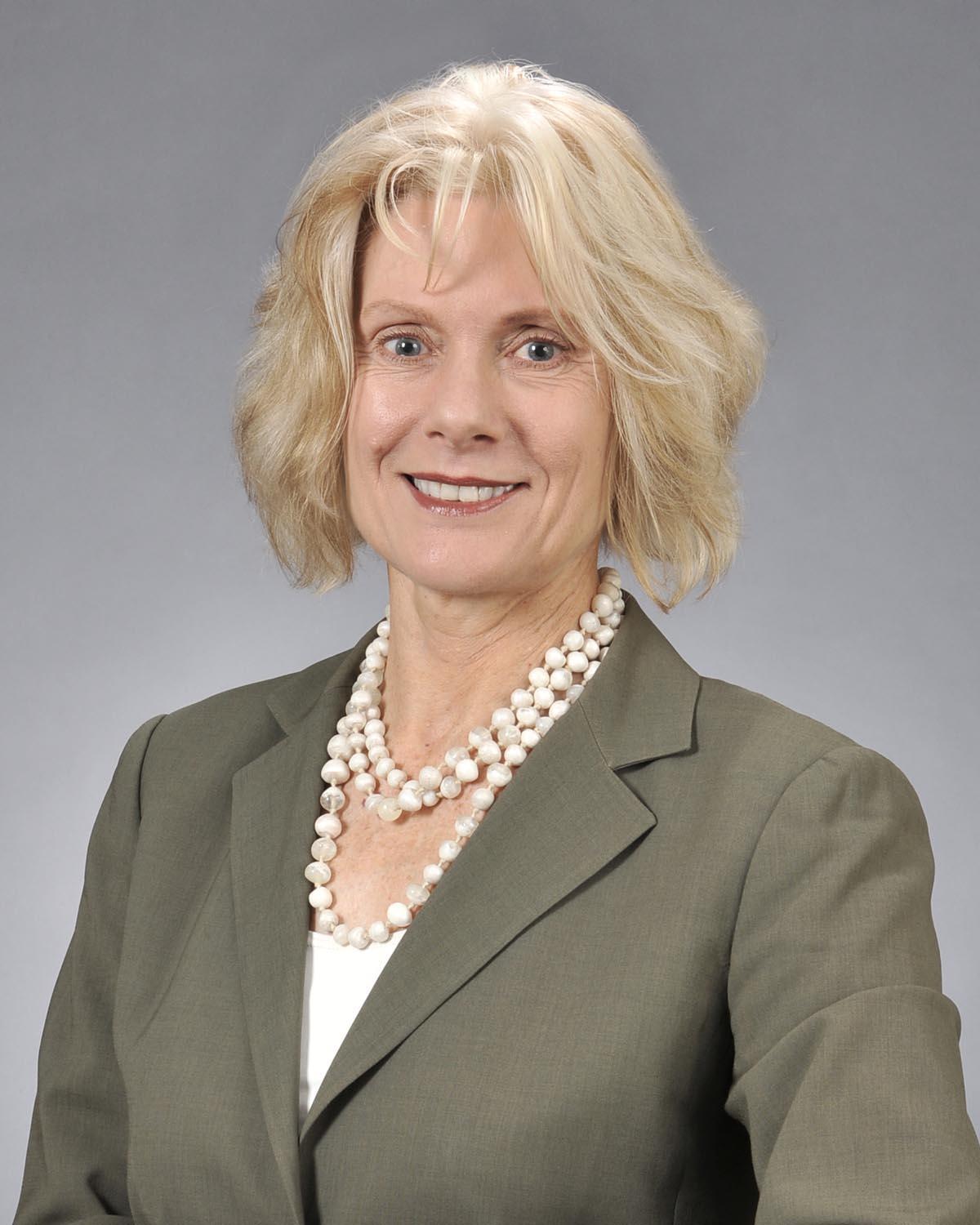
- Education: Australian National University (BS); University of Adelaide (PhD)
- Awards: NASA Group Achievement Award
- Scientific career
- Fields: Physics, climatology
- Workplaces: United States Naval Research Laboratory

Judith L. Lean is an Australian-American solar and climate scientist. She is a senior scientist at the United States Naval Research Laboratory. Lean is a three time recipient of the NASA Group Achievement Award and an elected member and fellow of several academic societies.

== Education ==
Lean completed a bachelor's degree in physics, with honors, at the Australian National University in 1974 and her doctorate in atmospheric physics at the University of Adelaide in 1980. Her dissertation was titled Atmospheric ultraviolet absorption spectroscopy.

== Career ==
Lean worked at the Cooperative Institute for Research in Environmental Sciences and the Applied Research Research Corporation in Maryland. In 1988, she joined the United States Naval Research Laboratory (NRL) as a research physicist in the Space Science Division. She is a senior scientist for Sun-Earth System Research at the NRL.

=== Research ===
Lean's research focuses on the mechanisms, measurements, modeling, and forecasting of variations in the Sun's radiative output at all wavelengths, and responses to this variability of the Earth's global climate, middle atmosphere, and space climate and weather. This research advances understanding of variations in the extended operational environment that can affect Naval assets and activities. She has been an Investigator for NASA and NOAA research grants, including the Upper Atmosphere Research Satellite, Living with a Star, Sun-Earth Connection and Glory Science Team, and NOAA's Climate Data Stewardship programs. Lean is a co-investigator on three NASA satellite missions, the Solar Radiation and Climate Experiment, Thermosphere Ionosphere Mesosphere Energetics and Dynamics, and the Solar Dynamics Observatory. She currently leads NRL's Integrating the Sun-Earth System (ISES) Accelerated Research Initiative.

Lean has authored or co-authored 117 refereed journal papers and 34 conference proceedings in the scientific literature. She has delivered over 290 presentations at scientific meetings, seminars, colloquia, and lectures. Lean was also a lead author of the Intergovernmental Panel on Climate Change (IPPC) Report, which was recognized with the 2007 Nobel Peace Prize; she has served on many NRC and NASA committees, including the recent NRC Decadal Surveys of Earth Science and Applications and Solar and Space Physics.

In 2014, the following two of her papers selected for publication in Geophysical Research Letters Top 40 edition.

- Lean, Judith; Beer, Jürg; Bradley, Raymond (1995). "Reconstruction of solar irradiance since 1610: Implications for climate change" (PDF). Geophysical Research Letters. 22 (23): 3195–3198. Bibcode:1995GeoRL..22.3195L. doi:10.1029/95GL03093. ISSN 1944-8007. S2CID 129462333. Archived from the original (PDF) on 2014-11-29.
- Kopp, Greg; Lean, Judith L. (2011). "A new, lower value of total solar irradiance: Evidence and climate significance: FRONTIER". Geophysical Research Letters. 38 (1). doi:10.1029/2010GL045777.

The 1995 paper was published, Lean explains, at a time when there was a lot of speculation about how much solar variability may have influenced climate change in recent centuries. The research by Lean, Beer, and Bradley provided a new way to numerically estimate past changes in total and ultraviolet solar irradiance based on contemporary records observed from satellites, combined with estimates of long-term solar variability reported (at the time) in Sun-like-stars. With this new reconstruction of historical solar irradiance since 1610, scientists could quantitatively estimate the Sun's contribution to global surface temperature changes. Lean and her colleagues found that the Sun may have contributed half of the changes since 1610 and less than a third of the changes since 1970, contrary to earlier research suggesting that the Sun may be entirely responsible. This meant that solar variability was not the primary cause of global warming in the past decades. Since the 1995 paper, many climate change studies have used the irradiance reconstruction for a variety of analyses and as input to climate model simulations. Although subsequent work with NRL co-authors Yi-Ming Wang and Neil Sheeley has since revised the magnitude of the total irradiance change during the past four centuries, the overall approach and methodology were first established in this 1995 GRL paper, which has been cited more than 600 times.

The 2011 paper, written with primary author Greg Kopp, Laboratory for Atmospheric and Space Physics (LASP), was published eight years after the 2003 launch on the Solar Radiation and Climate (SORCE) spacecraft; SORCE carried a new LASP-designed instrument that measured total solar irradiance with superior accuracy and precision. The new observations showed that the absolute value of total solar irradiance (during solar minimum conditions) was 1360.8 instead of 1365.4 W per m-2. Scientists had assumed the higher value was correct for over a decade. That higher value was typically used in climate model simulations and other applications needing to know the amount of energy the Sun provides to the Earth. Initially, most scientists thought that the new lower value was an error, but after exhaustive laboratory testing and re-calibrations, researchers determined that the lower value, not the higher value, was closer to the true value of total solar irradiance. This new lower value has since been confirmed by additional space-based radiometer measurements. As well, the new measurements from the SORCE spacecraft, which are not only more accurate but also more precise than prior observations, enabled the generation of a new model of solar irradiance variability, and an assessment of the contributions of solar variability to global change in the recent three decades, finding that although a solar cycle signal of 0.1 °C is detachable in the global climate record, solar variability is not a primary cause of recent global warming of about 0.4 °C from 1980 to 2010. The paper has already been cited more than 90 times.

== Awards and honors ==
Lean was elected a Fellow of the American Geophysical Union in 2002 and a member of the National Academy of Sciences in 2003. She has been honored with NASA Group Achievement Awards for SDO/EVE Science Team (2012) TIMED/SEE Science Team (2011) and UARS Instrument Development Group (1992), and a Presidential Meritorious Rank Award (2010). Lean is a member of the International Association of Geomagnetism and Aeronomy, American Astronomical Society-Solar Physics Division, American Meteorological Society, and the American Physical Society. In 2013, Lean was elected a member of the American Philosophical Society.

She was the 2024 recipient of the George Ellery Hale Prize of the American Astronomical Society, given "for her foundational studies in solar irradiance variability and its impact on the Earth’s atmosphere and climate, on time scales from days to centuries".
