= Jonathan Cirtain =

American physicist

Jonathan W. Cirtain is an American solar physicist. He won a Karen Harvey Prize in 2015. He was awarded a Presidential Early Career Award for Scientists and Engineers by Barack Obama in 2008. He became the CEO of Axiom Space in October 2025.
