= Dana W. Longcope =

American astronomer

- Citizenship: American
- Occupation: astronomer
- Awards: Karen Harvey Prize, Arctowski Medal

Dana W. Longcope is an American astronomer. He won the National Academy of Science’s Arctowski Medal in 2021 and the Karen Harvey Prize in 2003.
