= Richard B. Dunn =

American solar physicist and astronomer

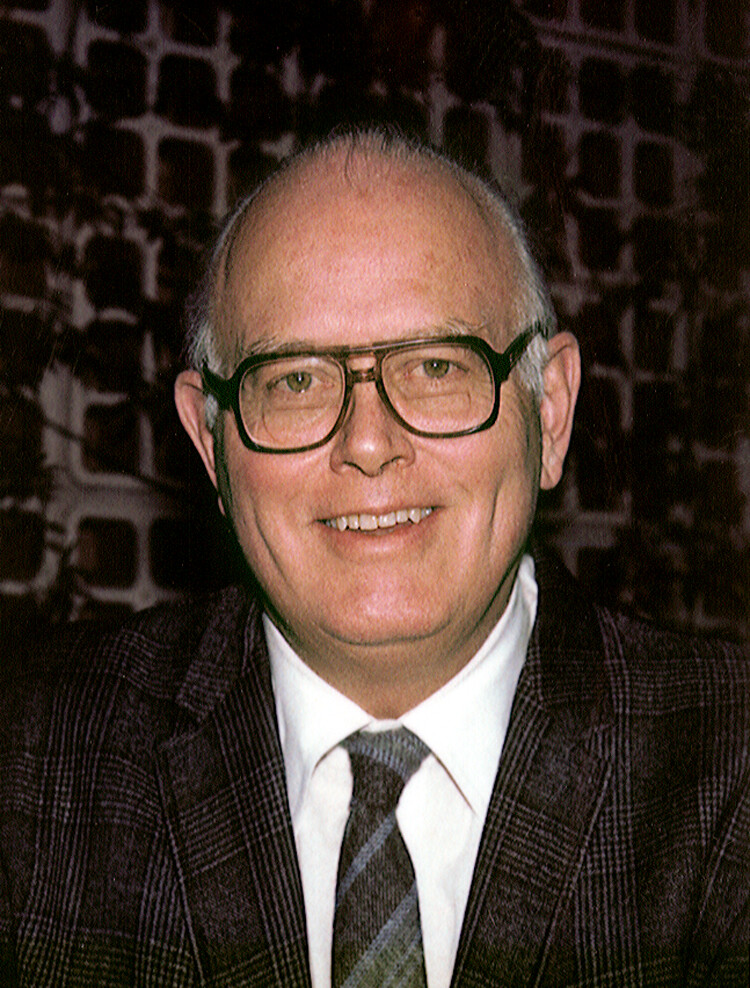
- Born: Richard Brandner Dunn; December 14, 1927; Baltimore, Maryland, U.S.
- Died: September 29, 2005 (aged 77); Las Cruces, New Mexico, U.S.
- Education: University of Minnesota (B.M.E., M.S.); Harvard University (Ph.D.)
- Spouse: Alice Jane Biggam (m. 1951)
- Father: Halbert L. Dunn
- Awards: George Ellery Hale Prize (1998)
- Scientific career
- Fields: Solar physics; Solar astronomy
- Workplaces: National Solar Observatory
- Thesis: Photometry of the Solar Chromosphere (1961)
- Doctoral advisor: Donald H. Menzel

Richard Brandner Dunn (December 14, 1927 – September 29, 2005) was an American solar physicist and astronomer who was a pioneer in solar physics. He is known for his designs of solar telescopes and their instruments, most notably the Richard B. Dunn Solar Telescope. At the time of his death he was astronomer emeritus of the National Solar Observatory.

== Biography ==
=== Early life and education ===
Dunn was born December 14, 1927, in Baltimore, Maryland, to Katherine Brandner and physician Halbert L. Dunn but was raised in Minneapolis, Minnesota. He served with the United States Army in Japan at the end of the Second World War.

Dunn attended the University of Minnesota, where he was awarded a bachelor's degree in mechanical engineering in 1949 and a master's degree in astronomy in 1950. For his master's degree he designed and built a Lyot filter for observing solar prominences. He began working towards a Ph.D. at Harvard University under Donald H. Menzel and in 1951 married Alice Biggam. While a graduate student he began working at Sacramento Peak Observatory (SPO) in Sunspot, New Mexico, collecting data for his doctoral thesis. (Note: Until 1956 the observatory was officially called the Upper Air Research Observatory of the Geophysics Research Directorate.) He was recruited to the observatory's scientific team in 1953 by director John Evans and remained at the observatory for the rest of his career. Alice took on the role of observatory librarian. Dunn built a 38 cm (15 in) solar telescope equipped with a birefringent filter and a film camera for recording chromospheric spicules, which he used to collect data for his thesis. In 1961 Harvard awarded him a Ph.D, with his thesis titled Photometry of the Solar Chromosphere.

=== Career ===
Dunn continued to develop new instruments for observing the Sun and in doing so was able make the highest quality observations of solar prominences and spicules yet made. His drive to increase the resolution of observations to see finer solar details defined the rest of his career. In 1965 he designed a new photoelectric spectrograph for recording solar flares.

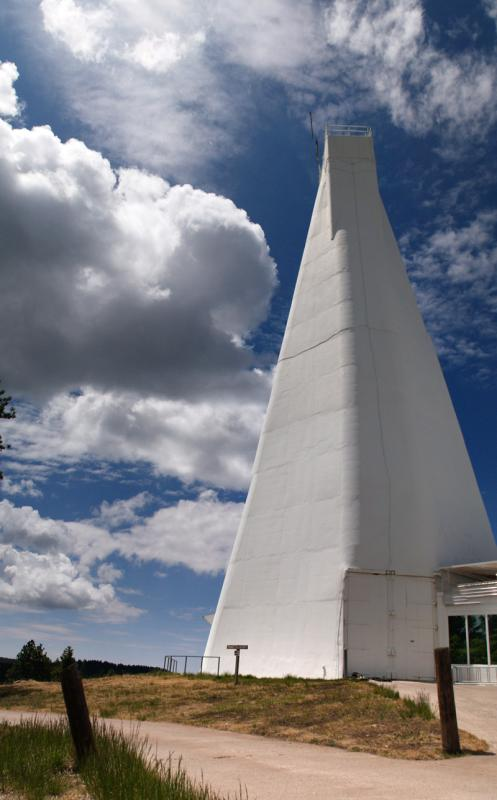
The exterior of the Richard B. Dunn Solar Telescope, more than half of the height of the telescope is underground

Dunn began a novel and pioneering design of large solar telescope for the observatory. To achieve high-resolution imagery it needed to have a long focal length, requiring a tower. To eliminate the distortions caused effects such as convection currents of the air inside the telescope ("internal seeing") he designed an evacuated chamber, where the light passes through a steel tube the full height of the telescope that contains a vacuum with windows at each end. To enable the telescope to turn with as little friction as possible the telescope would float in a tank of mercury. It was designed to be controlled by a computer and he designed some of the instruments to be used with the telescope. Construction began in 1966 and the telescope was dedicated in 1969 as the Vacuum Tower Telescope. For three decades it was the highest-resolution solar telescope in the world.

In 1976–1977 Dunn served as acting director of Sacramento Peak Observatory during its transition from being operated by the Air Force Cambridge Research Laboratories to the National Science Foundation.

In the 1970s Dunn designed and oversaw the installation of the Solar Observing Optical Network (SOON), comprising five identical solar telescopes located across the world to provide uninterrupted monitoring of solar activity by the U.S. Air Force.

Dunn was known internationally for the assistance he readily gave to other solar observatories in the design of solar telescopes and their instruments.

=== Later life ===
Dunn retired from the National Solar Observatory in 1998 but continued to work at the observatory part-time until 2003. In his later years he was diagnosed with Parkinson's disease. Dunn died September 29, 2005, in Las Cruces, New Mexico, from a heart attack at the age of 77. He was survived by his wife Alice.

== Awards and honors ==
In 1998 Dunn was awarded the George Ellery Hale Prize of the American Astronomical Society for his "bold and imaginative innovation of instrumentation for solar physics, his discovery of important new phenomena on the Sun, and the impact of his contributions on solar physicists worldwide." Later that year the National Science Foundation renamed the Vacuum Tower Telescope at Sacramento Peak as the Richard B. Dunn Solar Telescope. The rededication plaque describes Dunn as "one of solar astronomy's most creative instrument builders" and the telescope as his "masterpiece",
