= James Van Allen =

American space physicist (1914-2006)

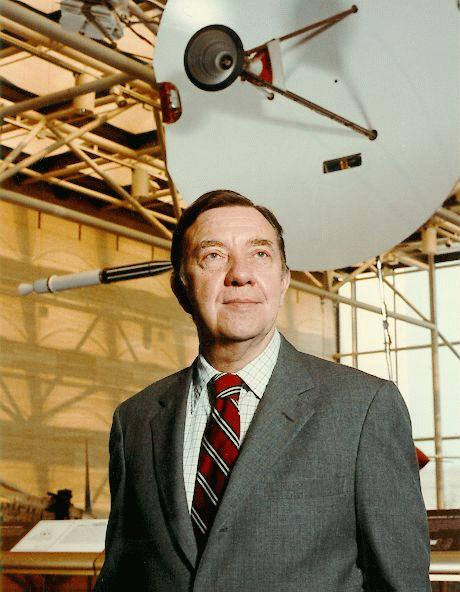
- Van Allen at the National Air and Space Museum, 1977
- Born: James Alfred Van Allen; September 7, 1914; Mount Pleasant, Iowa, U.S.
- Died: August 9, 2006 (aged 91); Iowa City, Iowa, U.S.
- Education: Iowa Wesleyan College B.S.; University of Iowa (M.S., Ph.D.)
- Known for: Van Allen radiation belts; Magnetospheric physics; Planetary magnetospheres of Jupiter and Saturn; Cosmic ray modulation in the heliosphere
- Awards: Time magazine Man of the Year (1960); Elliott Cresson Medal (1961); William Bowie Medal (1977); National Medal of Science (1987); Crafoord Prize (1989); Vannevar Bush Award (1991)
- Scientific career
- Fields: Space science Magnetospheric physics
- Workplaces: Carnegie Institution for Science (1939–1942); University of Iowa (1951–1985); Johns Hopkins University
- Thesis: Absolute cross-section for the nuclear disintegration H2 + H2 → H1 + H3 and its dependence on bombarding energy (1939)
- Doctoral advisor: Alexander Ellett
- Doctoral students: Michelle Thomsen; Stamatios Krimigis
- Other notable students: Nicholas M. Smith; Robert Ellis

James Alfred Van Allen (September 7, 1914 – August 9, 2006) was an American space physicist at the University of Iowa who was instrumental in establishing the field of magnetospheric research in space. His discovery of the Van Allen radiation belts in 1958, zones of energetic charged particles trapped by Earth's magnetic field, was the first major scientific finding of the Space Age. As principal investigator for scientific instruments on 24 Earth satellites and planetary missions, Van Allen provided the first in situ measurements of the magnetospheres of Jupiter and Saturn, pioneered the use of energetic particle absorption signatures to detect planetary rings and satellites, and carried out a multi-decade program of cosmic ray observations that established the radial gradient of galactic cosmic ray intensity from 1 AU to beyond 65 AU in the heliosphere.

A member of the National Academy of Sciences (elected 1959), the American Philosophical Society, and the American Academy of Arts and Sciences, Van Allen received the National Medal of Science (1987), the Crafoord Prize from the Royal Swedish Academy of Sciences (1989), the Gold Medal of the Royal Astronomical Society (1978), and the Vannevar Bush Award (1991). Time magazine named him one of its Men of the Year in 1960. He led the scientific community in putting research instruments on space satellites and was a leading advocate for unmanned planetary exploration, chairing the Outer Space Panel that developed the scientific rationale for the Pioneer 10 and Pioneer 11 missions to the outer planets. He was also an outspoken critic of human spaceflight programs, arguing that robotic spacecraft yielded far greater scientific returns per dollar spent.

== Early life and education ==
James Van Allen was born on September 7, 1914, on a small farm near Mount Pleasant, Iowa. He was fascinated by mechanical and electrical devices from childhood and was an avid reader of Popular Mechanics and Popular Science.

Van Allen earned his B.S. from Iowa Wesleyan College in 1935, followed by an M.S. (1936) and Ph.D. (1939) from the University of Iowa, where he studied nuclear physics under Alexander Ellett. A fellowship at the Carnegie Institution in Washington, D.C. broadened his research into geomagnetism, cosmic rays, auroral physics, and the physics of Earth's upper atmosphere.

== World War II ==
In August 1939, Van Allen joined the Department of Terrestrial Magnetism (DTM) of the Carnegie Institution as a research fellow. Beginning in 1940, he worked under Section T of the National Defense Research Committee (NDRC) on the development of photoelectric and radio proximity fuzes, detonators designed to increase the effectiveness of anti-aircraft fire. When this work was transferred to the newly created Applied Physics Laboratory (APL) of Johns Hopkins University in April 1942, Van Allen continued there, improving the ruggedness of vacuum tubes used in gun-battery fusing systems.

Commissioned as a U.S. Navy lieutenant in November 1942, Van Allen served 16 months on South Pacific Fleet destroyers, instructing gunnery officers and field-testing the then-secret proximity fuses. He was assistant staff gunnery officer on the battleship USS Washington during the Battle of the Philippine Sea (June 19–20, 1944) and was awarded four battle stars. He was promoted to lieutenant commander in 1946.

== High-altitude research and Rockoons (1946–1954) ==
Discharged from the Navy in 1946, Van Allen returned to APL, where he organized a team to conduct upper-atmosphere experiments using captured German V-2 rockets. He drew the specifications for the Aerobee sounding rocket and headed the committee that secured U.S. government funding for its production. The first instrument-carrying Aerobee, launched March 5, 1948, from White Sands, New Mexico, reached an altitude of 117.5 km carrying cosmic radiation instruments. Van Allen chaired the Upper Atmosphere Rocket Research Panel from 1947, coordinating early American high-altitude research.

In 1951, Van Allen accepted the position of head of the physics department at the University of Iowa. There he developed the Rockoon, a balloon-rocket combination that lifted small rockets on balloons to approximately 16 km altitude before firing them higher, a low-cost technique for reaching altitudes inaccessible to ground-launched sounding rockets alone. In 1953, Rockoons fired off Newfoundland provided the first hint of radiation surrounding the Earth.

In 1954, Ernst Stuhlinger visited Van Allen (then on sabbatical at Princeton) to discuss an unofficial satellite concept being developed by Wernher von Braun's group at the Army Ballistic Missile Agency. Van Allen expressed keen interest in using such a satellite for a worldwide survey of cosmic ray intensity above the atmosphere (Project Orbiter).

== International Geophysical Year and the discovery of the radiation belts ==
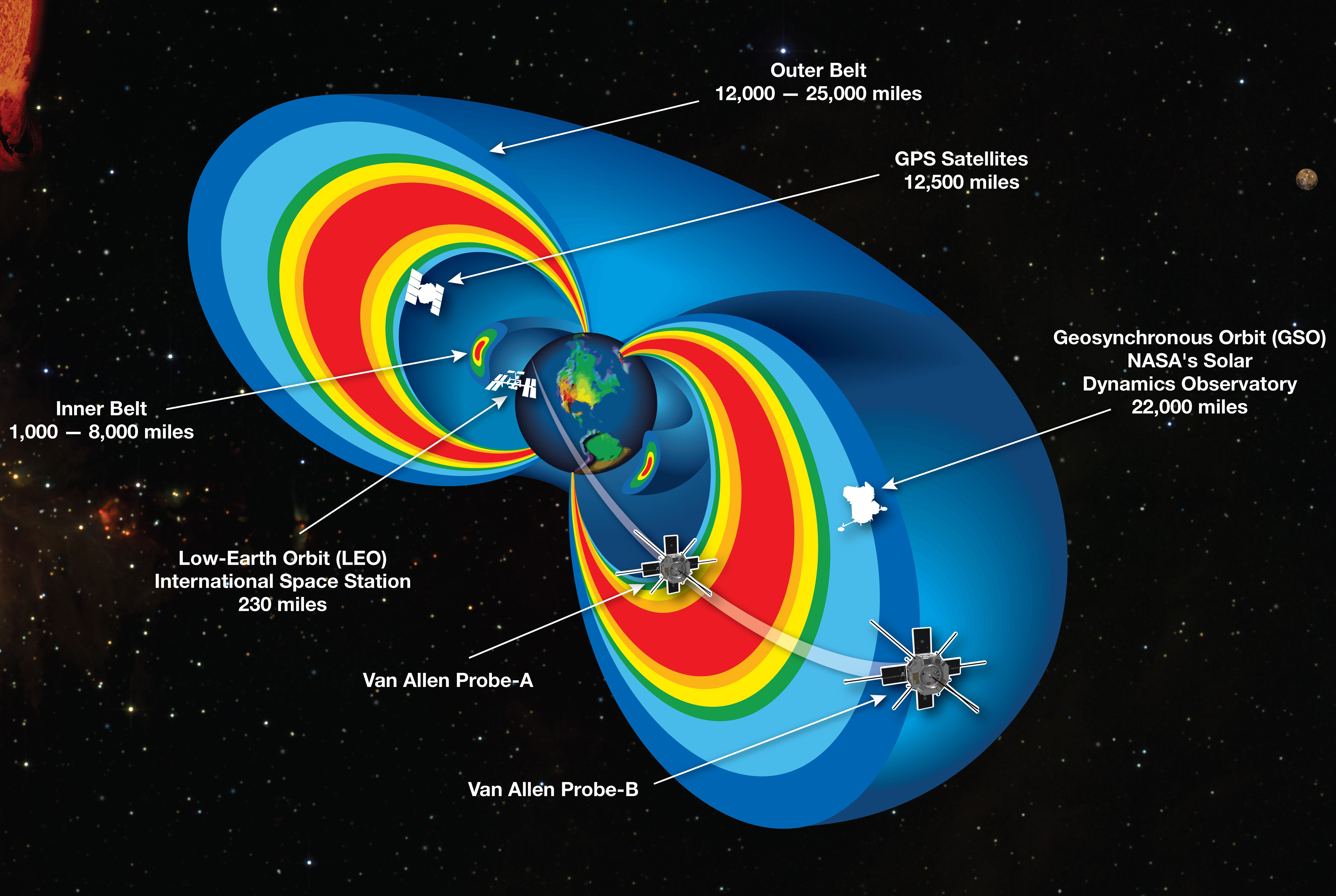
Model of Van Allen Radiation Belts, Credit: NASA

Van Allen played a catalytic role in the International Geophysical Year (IGY, 1957–58). In 1950, he hosted a gathering of scientists including Sydney Chapman, Lloyd Berkner, and S. Fred Singer at his home in Silver Spring, Maryland, at which the idea of a worldwide geophysical year was proposed. This concept grew into the IGY and, ultimately, the Space Race. Van Allen chaired a January 1956 symposium at the University of Michigan on "The Scientific Uses of Earth Satellites," at which 33 scientific proposals were presented. His Iowa group began preparing cosmic ray instruments for both Rockoon and Vanguard flights, and through what he later called "preparedness and good fortune," these instruments were available for the 1958 Explorer and Pioneer IGY launches.

On January 31, 1958, the first American satellite, Explorer 1, was launched into orbit carrying a cosmic ray experiment designed by Van Allen and his graduate students George H. Ludwig and Carl McIlwain, with satellite deployment supervised by Ernst Stuhlinger. The single Geiger counter on Explorer 1 returned confusing data, with periods of normal counting rates interspersed with intervals of zero counts. The puzzle was resolved after Explorer 3 (launched March 26, 1958) carried a miniature tape recorder that captured complete orbital data: the zero-count intervals occurred when the instrument was saturated by unexpectedly intense radiation, producing a null response.

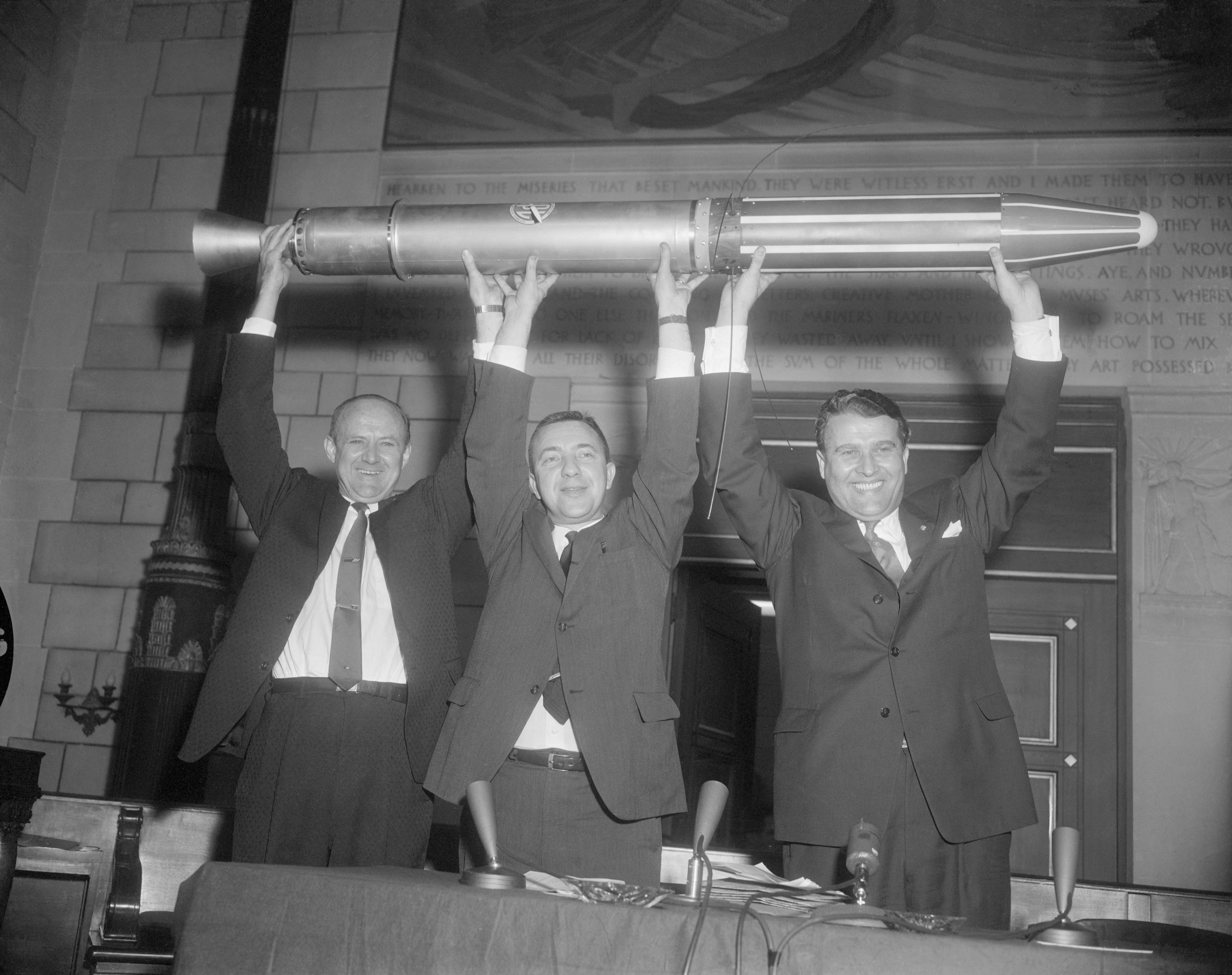
Pickering, Van Allen, and Von Braun at the IGY news conference, National Academy of Sciences, Washington, D.C.

Van Allen, Ludwig, McIlwain, and former student Ernest Ray recognized that the satellite was passing through vast regions of energetic charged particles trapped in Earth's magnetic field. On December 6, 1958, Pioneer 3 reached an altitude of 63,000 miles (101,000 km), and Van Allen's instruments revealed a second, outer radiation belt. The discovery of these trapped radiation zones, subsequently named the Van Allen radiation belts, constituted what Van Allen called "the first space-age scientific discovery" and spawned the new field of magnetospheric physics, which grew to involve over 1,000 researchers in more than 20 countries.

== Scientific contributions to magnetospheric physics ==
=== Earth's radiation belts and magnetosphere ===
Van Allen's initial work characterized the two-zone structure of Earth's trapped radiation. The inner belt, centered at roughly 1.5 Earth radii, consists predominantly of energetic protons produced by cosmic ray interactions with the upper atmosphere. The outer belt, at approximately 3–6 Earth radii, is composed mainly of energetic electrons injected during geomagnetic storms. Van Allen and colleagues mapped the spatial extent and energy spectra of these populations using Geiger counter instruments on the Explorer series satellites, establishing the basic morphology of the radiation environment that all subsequent spacecraft design has had to accommodate.

Through Explorer 52 (Hawkeye 1), a 22.65 kg satellite designed, built, and tracked at the University of Iowa and launched in June 1974 into a high-inclination polar orbit reaching 21 Earth radii, Van Allen and collaborators conducted the first systematic survey of Earth's high-latitude magnetosphere, including the polar cusp, magnetopause, and bow shock regions. As Hawkeye Project Scientist, Van Allen oversaw a program that generated over 50 publications, including new characterizations of auroral kilometric radiation, plasma wave phenomena along auroral field lines, and the discovery of the auroral density cavity. He and W. M. Farrell used Hawkeye magnetometer data to identify Earth's polar cleft at large radial distances by locating regions of strong negative deviations of magnetic field strength from the dipole model. Van Allen also used Hawkeye data to study currents on Earth's high-latitude magnetopause.

=== Jupiter's magnetosphere ===
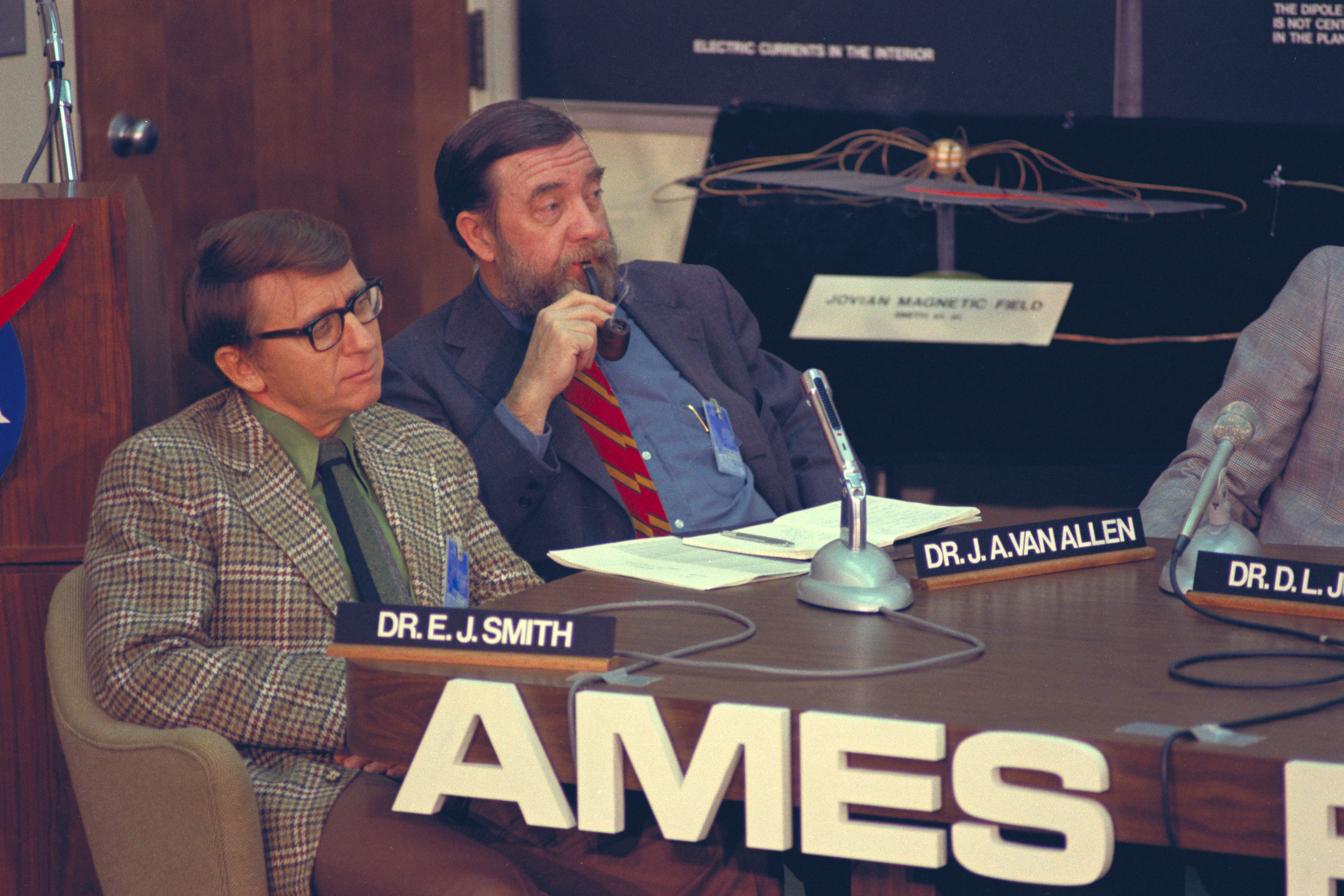
Van Allen alongside physicist Edward Smith at a Pioneer 11 press conference, 1974

As a member of the National Academy of Sciences space science board and NASA's lunar and planetary missions board in the late 1960s, Van Allen advocated for exploration of the outer planets. He chaired the Outer Space Panel that developed the scientific rationale for what became the Pioneer 10 and 11 missions. His Geiger Tube Telescope (GTT), weighing only 1.64 kg and consuming 25 mA, was selected for the Pioneer payload.

Pioneer 10's flyby of Jupiter in December 1973 yielded a landmark body of new knowledge about the planet's magnetosphere. In a series of papers, Van Allen and colleagues reported the first in situ observations of energetic electrons with energies exceeding 0.06 MeV trapped in Jupiter's magnetic field. The key findings included:

- Magnetodisc structure: The outer Jovian magnetosphere (beyond ~20 Jupiter radii, R_{J}) was found to take the form of a thin, disc-like quasi-trapping region extending beyond 100 R_{J}, confined near the magnetic equatorial plane with approximate axial symmetry about the magnetic axis. This was qualitatively different from the dipolar trapping geometry of Earth's magnetosphere.
- Dipole field parameters: Within 12 R_{J}, the observations were well organized by a centered dipolar model with a tilt of 9.5°±0.5° to Jupiter's rotational axis.
- Radiation intensity: Absolute omnidirectional intensities of trapped electrons were measured in five energy ranges, revealing radiation belt intensities orders of magnitude greater than those at Earth. For electrons with energies exceeding 21 MeV, the intensity within the stable trapping region followed an exponential radial dependence.

Pioneer 11's encounter with Jupiter in December 1974 along a different trajectory confirmed and expanded these findings. Van Allen noted that one particularly rewarding aspect of these encounters was the observation of interactions between radiation-belt particles and neutral material in Keplerian orbits around the planet. He was able to use particle absorption signatures to detect the presence of Jupiter's moons within the magnetosphere, a technique he would later apply extensively at Saturn.

=== Saturn's magnetosphere, rings, and inner satellites ===
Pioneer 11's flyby of Saturn on September 1, 1979 provided the first in situ discovery of Saturn's magnetosphere. Van Allen's instruments recorded the spacecraft crossing Saturn's bow shock approximately 1.5 million km from the planet, providing the first conclusive evidence of Saturn's magnetic field. In a landmark paper in Science, Van Allen and colleagues reported that Saturn's magnetosphere was intermediate between those of Earth and Jupiter in both physical dimensions and energetic particle populations, and that its scale in planetary radii more closely resembled Earth's, with much less plasma-driven inflation than at Jupiter.

A distinctive contribution of Van Allen's Saturn work was his use of energetic particle absorption signatures to probe the planet's ring system and inner satellites. Because rings and moons absorb trapped magnetospheric particles that drift through them, they leave measurable "shadows" or depletions in the particle flux. Van Allen's analysis of these absorption features yielded:

- Clear absorption signatures of the moons Dione and Mimas;
- Confirmation of the F ring between 2.336 and 2.371 Saturn radii (R_{S}) and of the Pioneer division between the F ring and the A ring;
- Detection of an object with diameter exceeding approximately 170 km at 2.534 R_{S}, and a second object of comparable diameter at 2.343 R_{S};
- Determination of the outer radius of the A ring at 2.292 R_{S}, inside which there was a virtually complete absence of magnetospheric particles.

This approach, using the magnetosphere itself as a probe of the physical environment, was a methodological innovation that influenced subsequent studies of the Saturnian system by Voyager 1, Voyager 2, and the Cassini mission. Van Allen published a detailed reanalysis of the Pioneer 11 absorption features in Icarus in 1982, developing the underlying theory of charged particle absorption by rings and satellites and reconciling the Pioneer results with optical evidence from the Voyager imaging systems. He also contributed to the Saturn monograph (University of Arizona Press, 1984) a comprehensive chapter on energetic particles in Saturn's inner magnetosphere.

=== Cosmic ray modulation in the outer heliosphere ===
After the planetary encounters, the Pioneer 10 and 11 spacecraft continued outward through the heliosphere, and Van Allen's instruments, still functioning on their minimal power budget, shifted to a second major research program: measuring the radial variation of galactic cosmic ray intensity with distance from the Sun.

Using simultaneous observations from the two Pioneer spacecraft and IMP-8 at 1 AU, Van Allen and B. A. Randall established continuous measurements of the radial gradient of cosmic ray intensity over the heliocentric distance range from 1 to beyond 65 AU across a 24-year period (1972–1996). Their key findings included:

- The radial gradient of cosmic ray intensity varied systematically with the solar cycle, reaching about 2.1% per AU at solar maximum and about 1.2% per AU at solar minimum;
- These measurements implied an apparent scale size of the heliospheric modulation region of approximately 48 AU at solar maximum and 83 AU at solar minimum;
- Following the great Forbush decrease of mid-1991, recovery of cosmic ray intensity in the outer heliosphere was markedly less complete than at 1 AU, indicating a long-lasting modulation effect in the distant solar wind.

These observations provided fundamental empirical constraints on theoretical models of cosmic ray transport in the heliosphere. As the aging Pioneer 10 power source declined, only Van Allen's experiment could still be operated; on March 31, 1997, his instrument provided the last science measurements from the Pioneer mission, a testimony to the reliability and simplicity of his instrument design philosophy.

== Advocacy for robotic exploration ==
Van Allen was a prominent and persistent critic of human spaceflight, arguing from the 1970s onward that robotic missions produced far greater scientific returns at far lower cost and risk. In a 1986 article in Scientific American, he contended that the Space Shuttle program and the proposed space station would "seriously diminish the opportunities for advancing space science and technology" by consuming budgets better allocated to unmanned missions. In his final major essay on the subject, published in Issues in Science and Technology in 2004, Van Allen wrote that "in a dispassionate comparison of the relative values of human and robotic spaceflight, the only surviving motivation for continuing human spaceflight is the ideology of adventure."

== Later career ==
Van Allen stepped down as the head of the department of physics and astronomy in 1985, but continued working at the University of Iowa as the Carver Professor of Physics, emeritus, actively analyzing data and publishing research until shortly before his death. On October 9, 2004, the University of Iowa hosted a celebration honoring his 90th birthday, featuring an invited lecture series and a banquet with many former colleagues and students. In August 2005, an elementary school bearing his name opened in North Liberty, Iowa.

== Personal life and death ==
Van Allen married Abigail Fithian Halsey II of Cincinnati (1922–2008) on October 13, 1945, in Southampton, Long Island. They met at APL during World War II. Their five children are Cynthia, Margot, Sarah, Thomas, and Peter.

On August 9, 2006, Van Allen died at University Hospitals in Iowa City from heart failure at age 91. He and his wife Abigail are buried in Southampton, New York.

== Selected publications ==
- Van Allen, James A. (1983). Origins of Magnetospheric Physics. Smithsonian Institution Press. p. 144. Expanded edition: Van Allen, James A. (2004). Origins of Magnetospheric Physics: An Expanded Edition. University of Iowa Press. ISBN 978-0-87745-921-7.
- Van Allen, James A. (1959). "Radiation Belts around the Earth". Scientific American. 200 (3): 39–47. doi:10.1038/scientificamerican0359-39.
- Van Allen, J. A.; et al. (1974). "The magnetosphere of Jupiter as observed with Pioneer 10". Journal of Geophysical Research. 79 (25): 3559–3577. doi:10.1029/JA079i025p03559.
- Van Allen, J. A.; et al. (1980). "Saturn's magnetosphere, rings, and inner satellites". Science. 207 (4429): 415–421. doi:10.1126/science.207.4429.415.
- Van Allen, J. A.; Randall, B. A. (1985). "Interplanetary cosmic ray intensity: 1972–1984 and out to 32 AU". Journal of Geophysical Research. 90 (A2): 1399–1412. doi:10.1029/JA090iA02p01399.

== Legacy and honors ==
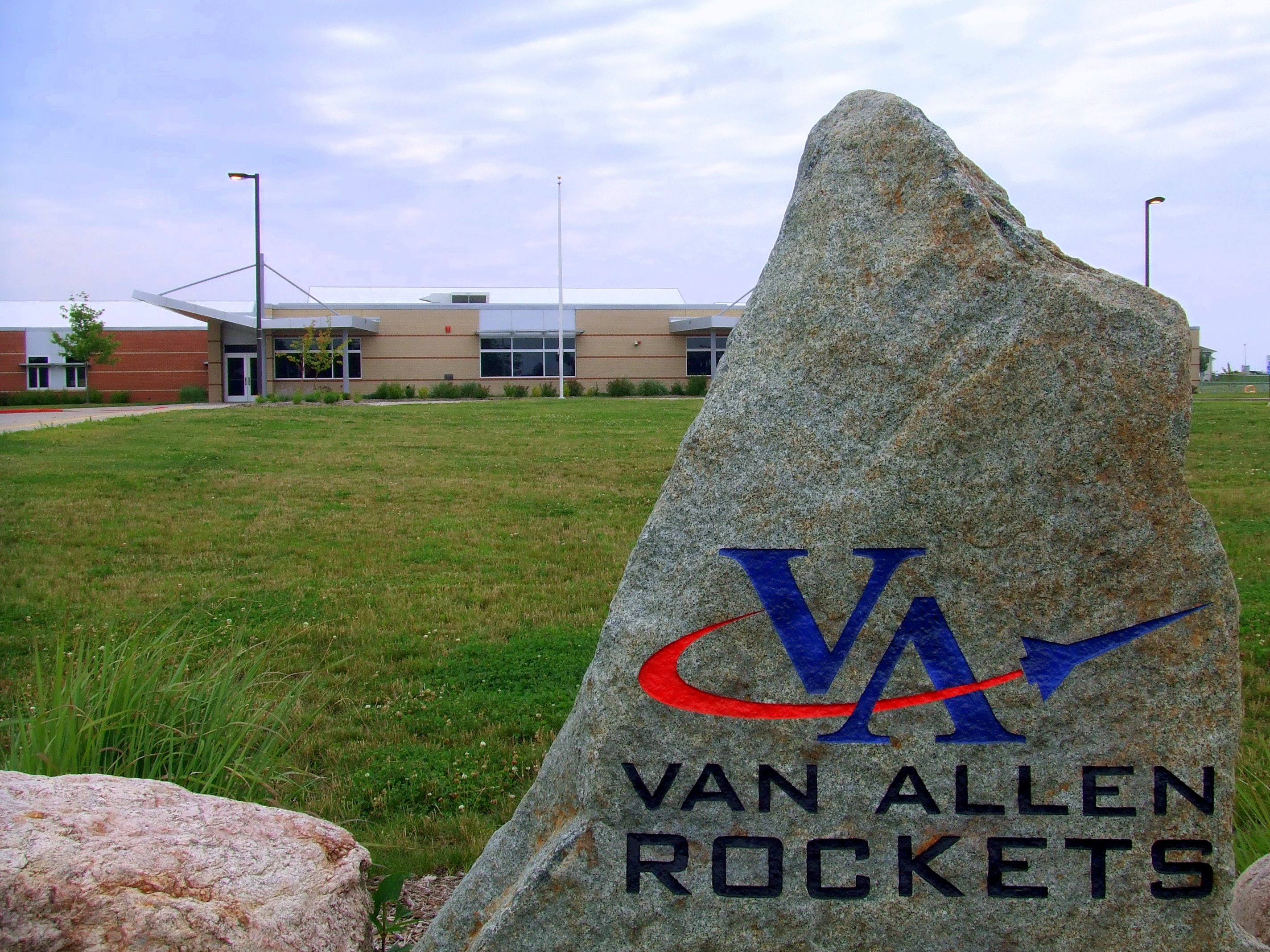
James Van Allen Elementary in North Liberty, Iowa

- Elected to the United States National Academy of Sciences (1959)
- Time magazine Man of the Year (1960)
- Elliott Cresson Medal (1961)
- Elected to the American Philosophical Society (1961)
- Elected to the American Academy of Arts and Sciences (1964)
- Gold Medal of the Royal Astronomical Society (1978)
- National Medal of Science (1987)
- Golden Plate Award of the American Academy of Achievement (1988)
- Crafoord Prize (1989)
- Vannevar Bush Award (1991)
- NASA's Lifetime Achievement Award (1994)
- National Air and Space Museum Trophy (2006)
- Van Allen Probes (NASA mission, renamed in his honor in 2012)
- Van Allen Hall houses the Physics Department at the University of Iowa

=== Van Allen Probes mission ===
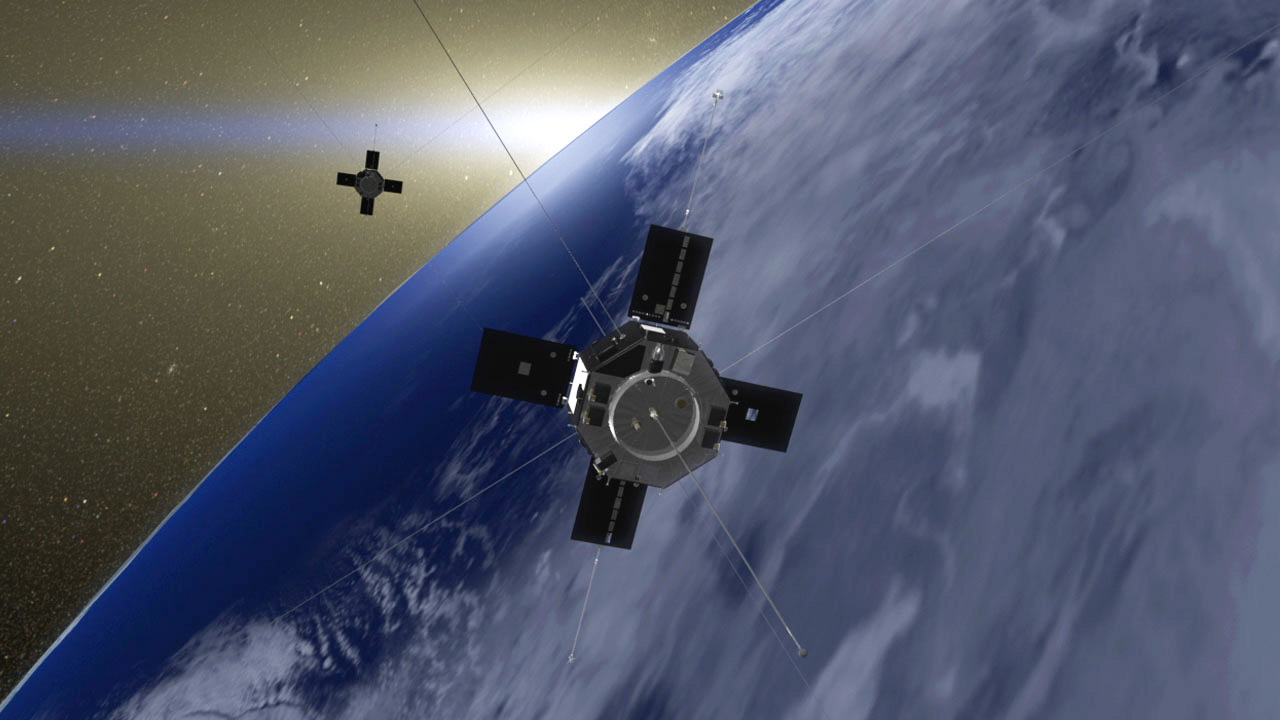
Artist's rendition of Van Allen Probes in Earth orbit. Credit: NASA

The Van Allen Probes, initially the Radiation Belt Storm Probes (RBSP), were renamed in 2012 in Van Allen's honor. Managed by Goddard Space Flight Center and implemented by APL at Johns Hopkins, the twin spacecraft were part of the Living With a Star program. Launched August 30, 2012 on an Atlas V 401 rocket, the mission was designed for two years but operated for seven, demonstrating significant resilience against radiation.

Key discoveries by the Van Allen Probes included the transient appearance of a third radiation belt in February 2013, which lasted several weeks and provided new insights into belt dynamics; and characterization of Earth's ring current, revealing a persistent substantial current carried by high-energy protons even during non-storm periods, with storm-time enhancements driven by low-energy proton injection. The mission concluded with the deactivation of Probe B in July 2019 and Probe A in October 2019, with orbits lowered for atmospheric reentry by 2034.

== Biography ==
Abigail M. Foerstner wrote James van Allen: The First Eight Billion Miles, published by University of Iowa Press in 2007 (paperback 2009).

== See also ==
- George H. Ludwig
- Stamatios Krimigis
- Explorer program
- Pioneer 10, Pioneer 11
- Van Allen radiation belt
- Magnetosphere
