= Sarah E. Gibson =

American solar physicist

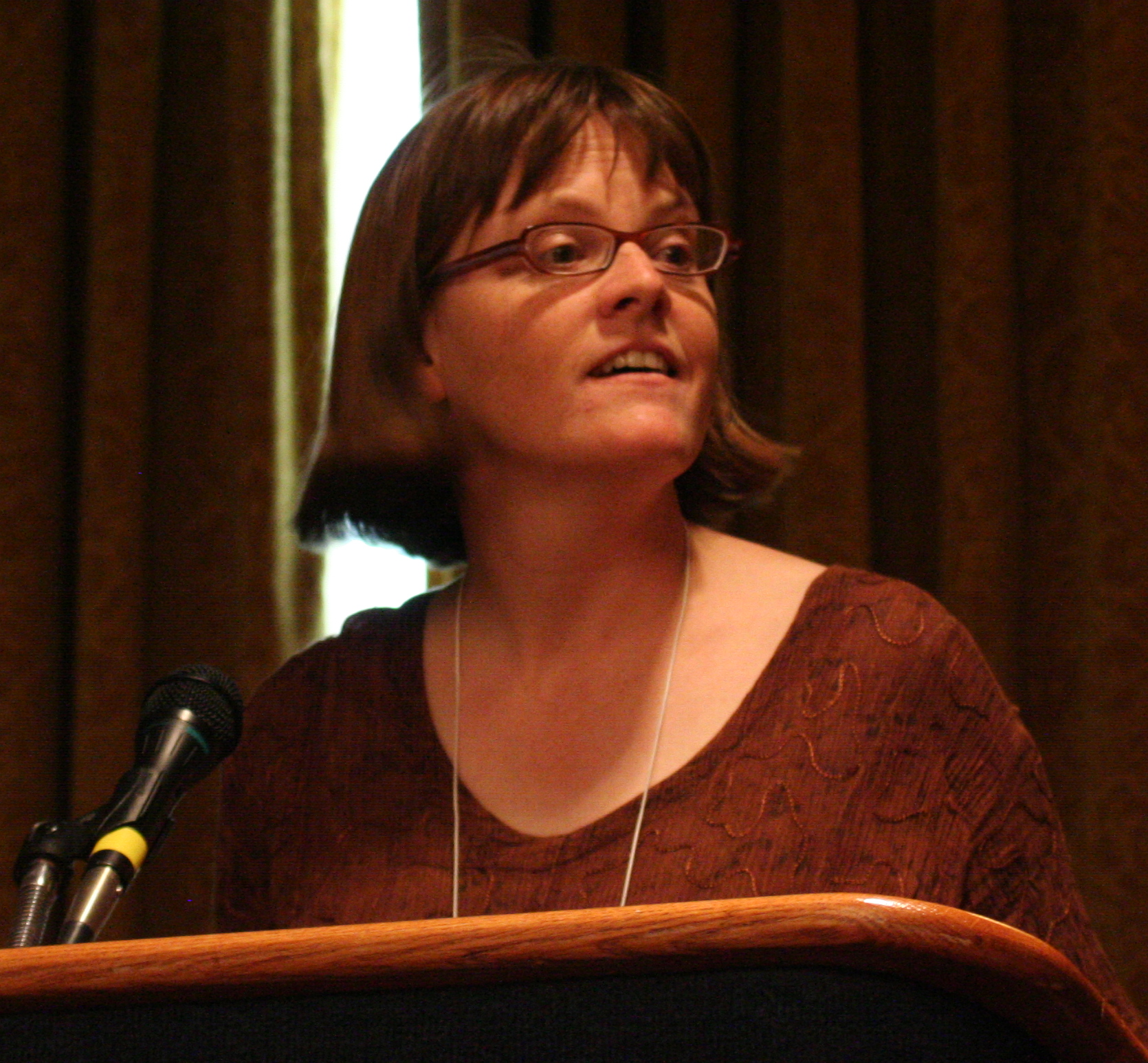
- Gibson at Marshall Space Flight Center in 2009
- Education: Stanford University (BSc, Physics, 1989); University of Colorado Boulder (PhD, Astrophysics, 1995)
- Scientific career
- Fields: Astrophysics; Physics
- Workplaces: High Altitude Observatory

Sarah E. Gibson is an American solar physicist. She is a Senior Scientist and past Interim Director of the High Altitude Observatory in Boulder, Colorado. As of 2019, Dr. Gibson is the Project Scientist for the PUNCH Small Explorer mission being built for NASA.

== Education ==
Gibson received her Bachelor of Science degree in Physics from the Stanford University in 1989,then Master of Science (1993) and Doctor of Philosophy (1995) degrees in Astrophysics from the University of Colorado.

== Research and career ==
Gibson's research interests include solar physics and space weather phenomena. She is noted for extensive work developing the theory of coronal mass ejections (CMEs) and their precursors, and for organizing scientific collaborations that advance global understanding of the Sun and heliosphere. She is the author of a Living Review in Solar Physics on the subject of Solar Prominences: Theory and Models.

Gibson has been a member of the National Academy's Space Studies Board and co-chair of its Committee on Solar and Space Physics, and was president of the IAU's Division E (Sun and Heliosphere). She is a Fellow of the American Geophysics Union and the recipient of the 2005 American Astronomical Society Solar Physics Division's Karen Harvey Prize for early achievement in solar physics and the 2024 American Geophysical Union Space Physics and Aeronomy Eugene Parker Lecture. She also co-wrote a solar eclipse musical parody ("My Corona") which won the Solar Physics Division Popular Media Award in 2024.

In 2026, Gibson was elected to the National Academy of Sciences.
