= Mukul Kundu =

Indian solar physicist

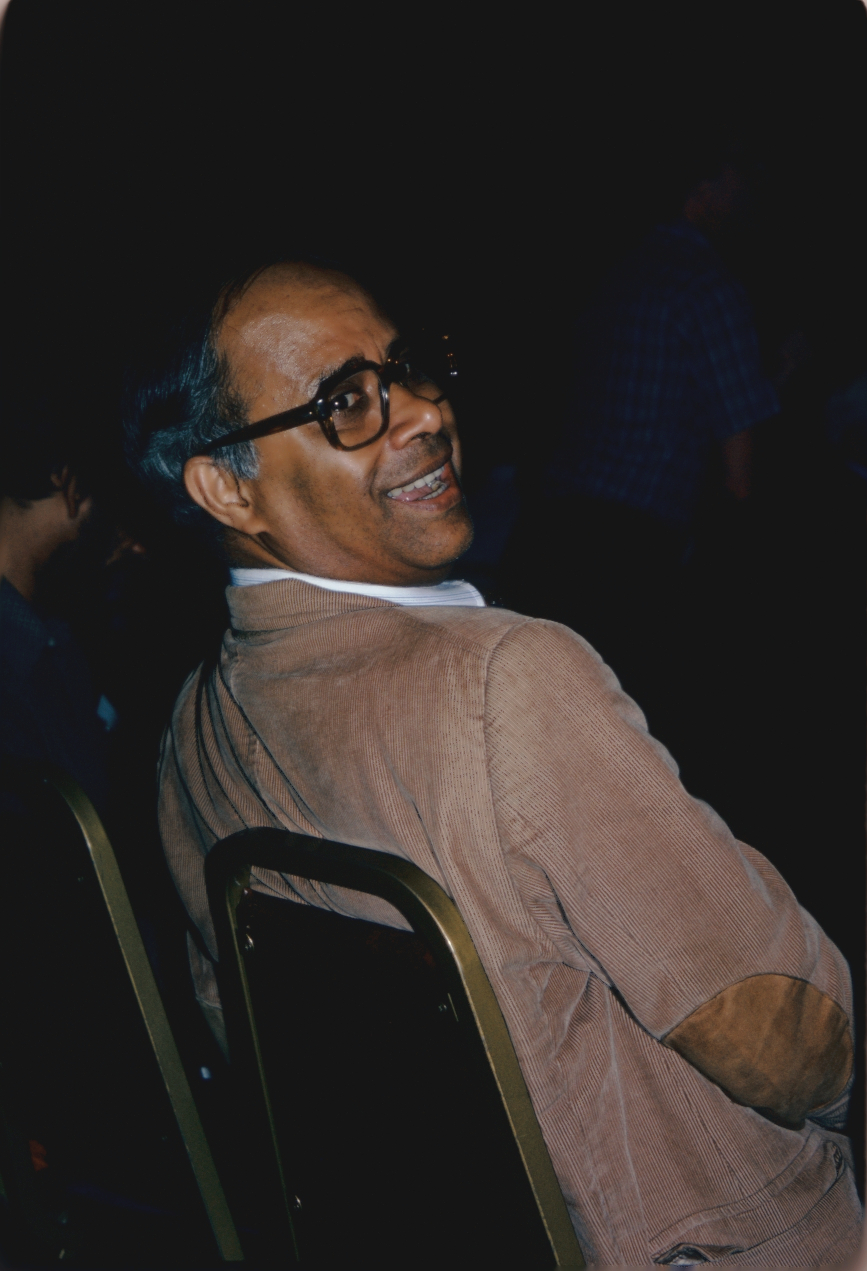
Mukul Kundu, August 1981, at the URSI meeting, Washington DC.

Mukul Ranjan Kundu (10 February 1930 – 16 June 2010), was an Indian solar physicist, known best as a pioneer of radio observations of the Sun. Early in his career, he showed that the Sun's 10.7 centimetre radio flux is correlated with the level of ionisation in the Earth's ionosphere. The 10.7 cm flux is now used as a standard proxy for the level of magnetic activity on the Sun. He served on the editorial board of the journal Solar Physics and was awarded the George Ellery Hale Prize in 2007.

== Life and career ==
Kundu was born in Calcutta, India on 10 February 1930. He studied at the University of Calcutta, receiving his BSc in Physics in 1949 and his MSc in Radio Physics and Electronics in 1951. In 1954, he took a government scholarship to study at the Ecole Normale Superieure in Paris and transferred with the radio group to the Paris Observatory. He obtained his PhD from Sorbonne in 1957.

He started working at the University of Michigan in 1959 and moved to Cornell University as an associate professor in 1962. In 1965, he return to India to join the Tata Institute of Fundamental Research until 1968, when he became a full professor at the University of Maryland, College Park, where he remained until his death on 16 June 2010.

Kundu's most influential work was a textbook, Solar Radio Astronomy, which was published by Wiley in 1965. He was a fellow of the American Physical Society. Kundu also received the award of U.S.Senior Scientist from the Humboldt Foundation.
