= Jacques Beckers =

Dutch-born American astronomer (1934–2021)

Jacques Maurice Beckers (14 February 1934 – 26 February 2021) was a Dutch-born American astronomer. He was director of the National Solar Observatory between 1993 and 1998. Beckers worked mainly in the field of astrophysics and astronomical optometry.

== Career ==
Beckers was born on 14 February 1934, in Arnhem. He studied at Utrecht University, where he obtained a PhD under Marcel Minnaert in 1964. Beckers then moved to the United States, where he obtained American nationality in 1968. He was director of the Multiple Mirror Telescope at Mount Hopkins in Arizona from 1979 to 1984. Afterwards Beckers served as head of the National New Technology Telescope (NNTT) project. Although initially enthusiastic Beckers became frustrated when the director of the National Optical Astronomy Observatory limited the scope of his project. In 1988 he started as research leader of the Interferometry Group at the Very Large Telescope of the European Southern Observatory in Chile. In 1993 Beckers moved back to the United States to become director of the National Solar Observatory, which he was between 1993 and 1998. He worked a further three years as researcher at the observatory. In 2001 Beckers started as scientist at the University of Chicago.

As a researcher Beckers worked mainly in the field of astrophysics and astronomical instrumentation in the field of optometry.

== Awards and honors ==
Beckers was awarded the Arctowski Medal by the National Academy of Sciences of the United States in 1975. In 1988 he became a foreign member of the Norwegian Academy of Science and Letters. Beckers was elected a corresponding member of the Royal Netherlands Academy of Arts and Sciences in 1989. In 2004 Lund University awarded Beckers an honorary degree. One year later he was made a Knight in the Order of the Netherlands Lion.
