= Jiong Qiu =

Chinese-born American astrophysicist

Jiong Qiu (邱炯) is a Chinese-born American astrophysicist who won the Karen Harvey Prize for her work in solar flares.

== Academic career ==
Qiu completed her Bachelors of Science in Astronomy in 1993 at Nanjing University located in Jiangsu, China. Five years later she was awarded her PhD from the same university for her observational work in solar flares. Between acquiring her Bachelors and her PhD, between 1996–1997, she obtained a student fellowship that allowed her to work at Arcetri Astrophysics Observatory in Italy.

Following her PhD, Qiu was accepted as a postdoc with the Big Bear Solar Observatory in California to further investigate solar flares, and to begin directly monitoring the Earth's atmosphere via measurements of Earthshine.

In 2005, she accepted a position with Montana State University, in Bozeman, Montana, as an assistant professor in Physics and Astronomy.

== Scientific work ==
Qiu has added contributed to the fields of Heliophysics, Heliodynamics, and the Atmospheric sciences. She currently works with the Solar Physics Group at Montana State University. Her current research interests are:

- Magnetic Reconnection and Energy Release in Solar Flares
- Large-scale solar magnetic reconfiguration
- Small-scale Active Region Energy Release Events
- Particle Acceleration in Flare Environment
- Dynamics of Solar Flares and Active Regions
- Earthshine Measurements of Global Atmospheric Change

Her current research is centered on solar eruption events, and focused on understanding magnetic reconnection during these explosive events, using both ground-based telescopes and satellites.

== Awards ==
In addition to receiving grants from the National Science Foundation and NASA, Qiu was the 2007 recipient of the Karen Harvey Prize for her major contributions to scientific understanding of the Sun, its effects on the atmosphere of the Earth, and its effects on Earth's climate.

== Publications ==
- Falchi, A.; Qiu, J.; Cauzzi, G. (1997). "Chromospheric Evidence for Magnetic Reconnection" (PDF). Astronomy and Astrophysics. 328: 371. Bibcode:1997A&A...328..371F.
- Liu, W-J.; Qiu, J.; Longcope, D. W.; Caspi, A. (2013). "Determining Heating Rates in Reconnection Formed Flare Loops of the M8.0 Flare on 2005 May 13" (PDF). Astrophysical Journal. 770 (2): 111. arXiv:1304.4521. Bibcode:2013ApJ...770..111L. doi:10.1088/0004-637X/770/2/111. S2CID 8441731.
- Qiu, J.; Wang, H.; Cheng, C.Z.; Gary, D.E. (2004). "Magnetic Reconnection and Mass Acceleration in Flare-Coronal Mass Ejection Events" (PDF). Astrophysical Journal. 604 (2): 900. Bibcode:2004ApJ...604..900Q. doi:10.1086/382122. S2CID 11772142.
