= Harvey Summit =

Mountain in Antarctica

- Location within Antarctica

Highest point
- Coordinates: 78.3144444°S 162.3025°E

Geography
- Continent: Antarctica
- Region: Victoria Land

Harvey Summit (78.3144444°S 162.3025°E) is a peak 2,644 metres (8,675 ft) high at the head of McDermott Glacier in the Royal Society Range of Victoria Land, Antarctica. It was named by the United States Advisory Committee on Antarctic Names (US-ACAN) after John W. Harvey of the National Solar Observatory who, along with Thomas L. Duvall, Jr. and Martin A. Pomerantz, conducted research in helioseismology at the South Pole for some years from 1980 onwards.

== Features ==
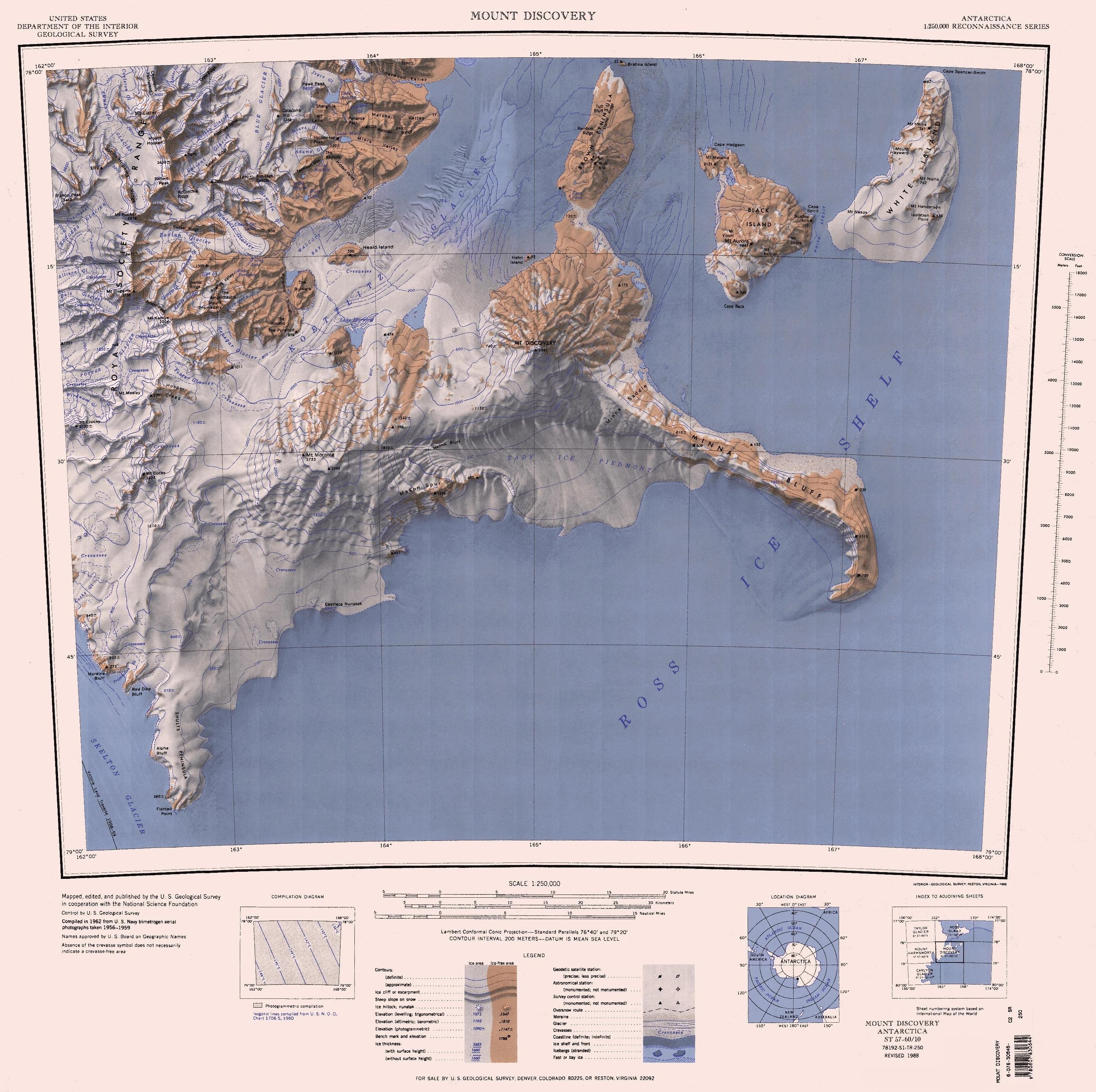
The ridges containing Mount Moxley and Mount Lisicky are south of Mount Huggins in the center west of the map.

Harvey Summit is to the southeast of Mount Huggins. Nearby features include:

=== Hofmann Spur ===
78.2833333°S 162.0666667°E An ice-covered spur between Allison Glacier and Dale Glacier on the west side of Royal Society Range. Named by US-ACAN (1994) after David J. Hofmann of the University of Wyoming and NOAA. He conducted upper atmospheric research through high-altitude ballooning in Antarctica for over 15 years, contributing to the understanding of the ozone hole.

=== Dot Cliff ===
78.3166667°S 161.95°E The cliff at the west end of the spur between Dimick Peaks and Berry Spur. Descriptively named by US-ACAN (1994) from the appearance of the small rock cliff at the end of a snow-covered mountain spur.

=== Dimick Peaks ===
78°18′S 161°56′E. Two peaks, the highest rising to 1,495 metres (4,905 ft) high, at the south side of the mouth of Dale Glacier. Named by US-ACAN in 1994 after Dorothy Dimick, USGS cartographer, an Antarctic specialist in the Branch of Special Maps, 1944-76.

=== McDermott Glacier ===
78.3333333°S 162.0666667°E A glacier flowing west from Royal Society Range between Dot Cliff and Berry Spur. Named by US-ACAN (1994) after Cathleen McDermott, United States Geological Survey (USGS) cartographer, a member of the satellite surveying team at South Pole Station, winter party 1993.

=== Berry Spur ===
78.35°S 162.1166667°E A mostly ice-covered spur between McDermott Glacier and Comberiate Glacier on the west side of Royal Society Range, Victoria Land. Named by US-ACAN (1994) after Russell D. Berry, United States Geological Survey (USGS) cartographer, a member of the satellite surveying team at South Pole Station, winter party 1983.

=== Comberiate Glacier ===
78.35°S 162.2333333°E A glacier flowing west from Royal Society Range between Berry Spur and Utz Spur. Named by US-ACAN (1994) after Michael A. Comberiate, who was instrumental in developing a system for satellite communications to and within Antarctica, the South Pole Satellite Data Link (SPSDL).

=== Utz Spur ===
78.3566667°S 162.3244444°E An ice-covered spur between the upper parts of the Comberiate Glacier and Potter Glacier. Named by US-ACAN (1994) after Loreen G. Utz, USGS cartographer, a member of the satellite surveying team at South Pole Station, winter party 1983.

=== Mount Moxley ===
78°25′S 162°21′E. A peak in the Royal Society Range, surmounting the divide between Potter Glacier and Wirdnam Glacier. Mapped by USGS from ground surveys and Navy air photos. Named by US-ACAN in 1963 for Lieutenant (jg) Donald F. Moxley, United States Navy, Otter and helicopter pilot with Squadron VX-6 at McMurdo Station in 1960.

=== Kennedy Ridge ===
78°24′S 162°08′E. An ice-covered ridge, 3.5 nautical miles (6.5 km; 4.0 mi) long, which is notably straight and extends west from Mount Moxley between Potter Glacier and Wirdnam Glacier. Named by US-ACAN in 1994 after Nadene Kennedy, Polar Coordination Specialist, Office of Polar Programs, National Science Foundation. Associated with NSF Antarctic Program since 1978, including ten working visits to the continent; at the time of naming, NSF liaison with Antarctic tourist industry, responsible for implementing Antarctic Treaty reporting requirements and coordination of Antarctic visitor program.

=== Mount Lisicky ===
78°27′S 162°05′E A peak, 2,120 metres (6,960 ft) high, standing 7 nautical miles (13 km; 8.1 mi) northwest of Mount Cocks. Mapped by USGS from ground surveys and Navy air photos. Named by US-ACAN in 1963 for Capt. Joseph F. Lisicky, USMC, maintenance officer for United States Navy Operation Deep Freeze, 1960, who served several summers at McMurdo Station.

== Sources ==
- Alberts, Fred G., ed. (1995), Geographic Names of the Antarctic (PDF) (2 ed.), United States Board on Geographic Names This article incorporates public domain material from websites or documents of the United States Board on Geographic Names.
- "Berry Spur", Geographic Names Information System, United States Geological Survey, United States Department of the Interior
- "Comberiate Glacier", Geographic Names Information System, United States Geological Survey, United States Department of the Interior
- "Dot Cliff", Geographic Names Information System, United States Geological Survey, United States Department of the Interior
- "Harvey Summit", Geographic Names Information System, United States Geological Survey, United States Department of the Interior
- "Hofmann Spur", Geographic Names Information System, United States Geological Survey, United States Department of the Interior
- "McDermott Glacier", Geographic Names Information System, United States Geological Survey, United States Department of the Interior
- Mount Discovery, USGS: United States Geological Survey
- "Utz Spur", Geographic Names Information System, United States Geological Survey, United States Department of the Interior

This article incorporates public domain material from websites or documents of the United States Geological Survey.
