= Sarbani Basu =

Indian astrophysicist

- Education: University of Madras University of Poona University of Bombay
- Scientific career
- Workplaces: Yale University University of Aarhus Queen Mary University of London

Sarbani Basu is an Indian astrophysicist and Professor at Yale University. She is on the board of directors of the Association of Universities for Research in Astronomy and a Fellow of the American Association for the Advancement of Science.

== Education ==
Basu earned her bachelor's degree at the University of Madras in 1986. She completed her graduate studies at the Savitribai Phule Pune University and University of Mumbai, gaining her PhD in 1993.

== Research ==
In 1993 Basu joined Queen Mary University of London as a postdoctoral researcher, before moving to the Aarhus University. She won the 1996 M. K. Vainu Bappu Gold Medal from the Astronomical Society of India. In 1997 she joined Princeton University as a member of the Institute for Advanced Study. In 2000 she was appointed Assistant Professor at Yale University, and promoted to Professor in 2005. She won the 2002 Hellman Family Faculty Fellowship. She is interested in the structure and dynamics of the sun, and studies them using stellar oscillations. By monitoring helioseismic inversions Basu determines what processes take place inside the sun. She has written a book chapter about Helioseismology.

Basu has published over 200 papers in peer-reviewed scientific journals and has a H-index of 82. She also visits schools to discuss her research with young people.

== Honors and awards ==
Basu was elected a Fellow of the American Association for the Advancement of Science in 2015. In 2017 she published "Asteroseismic Data Analysis Foundations and Techniques" with William Chaplin. She won the American Astronomical Society's George Ellery Hale Prize in 2018 for her contributions to our understanding of the internal structure of the Sun. She was presented with the award at the Triennial Earth-Sun Summit in Virginia. She was elected a Legacy Fellow of the American Astronomical Society in 2020.
