= Manfred Schüssler =

German physicist

Manfred Schüssler is a German solar physicist at the Max Planck Institute for Solar System Research. In 2017, he was awarded the George Ellery Hale Prize and the Senior Prize of the Solar Physics Division of the European Physical Society for his contributions to the study of the solar dynamo.
