= Michelle Thomsen =

American space physicist

Michelle Fluckey Thomsen
- Education: University of Iowa
- Scientific career
- Workplaces: Planetary Science Institute
- Thesis: On determining a radical diffusion coefficient from the observed effects of Jupiter's satellites (1977)
- Doctoral advisor: James Van Allen

Michelle F. Thomsen is space physicist known for her research on the magnetospheres of Earth, Jupiter, and Saturn.

== Education and career ==
Thomsen received an undergraduate degree from Colorado College in 1971. She then earned an M.S. (1974) and a Ph.D. (1977) in physics from the University of Iowa.

Her doctoral advisor, James Van Allen, recruited her right from her entrance exam to work on the data from Pioneer 10 and Pioneer 11 on the radiation belts of Jupiter and Saturn. From 1977 until 1980 she remained at the University of Iowa as a postdoctoral scientist, and then left for the Max-Planck-Institut fur Aeronomie in Lindau, West Germany. In 1981 she joined Los Alamos National Laboratory. There, she served as the Space Physics Team Leader of the LANL Space and Atmospheric Sciences Group, the Director of the LANL Center for Space Science and Exploration, and the NASA Program Manager.

In 2013, she joined the Planetary Science Institute as a permanent staff.

As of 2019, she is a guest scientist at Los Alamos and a senior scientist at the Planetary Science Institute.

She has been involved in many committees of the American Geophysical Union (AGU) and NASA:

- Chair of the AGU Panel on Solar-Wind/Magnetospheric Interactions
- Chair of the AGU Solar and Space Physics Decadal Survey Committee
- Chair of the AGU National Academy of Sciences Space Studies Board
- Chair of the NASA Sun-Earth Connections Advisory Subcommittee
- Chair of the NASA Earth-Sun Systems Subcommittee
- Member of the NASA Heliophysics Advisory Subcommittee

In the publishing domain, she has been an Associate Editor of Geophysical Research Letters and a member of the editorial board of Space Science Reviews.

== Research ==
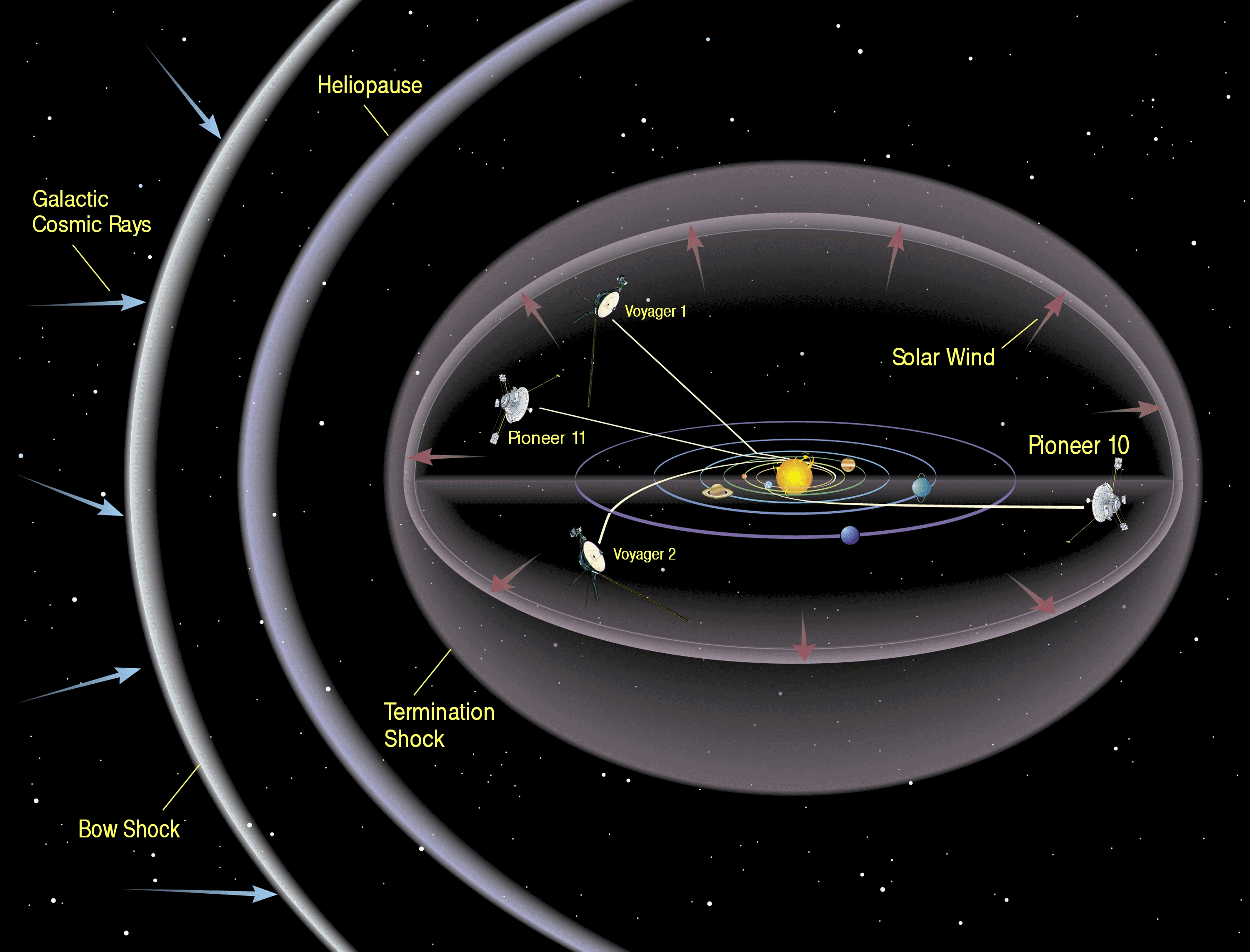
The figure shows the systems making up Pioneer 10 which Thomsen used in her graduate research to study the radiation belts of Jupiter.

Thomsen's early research was on the magnetospheres of Jupiter and Saturn. Her research on Earth's bow shock used the ISEE-1 and ISEE-2 satellites to track the behavior of high energy particles from the magnetosphere. She has also studied the cavities upstream of Earth's bow shock, the comet 21P/Giacobini–Zinner, and the physics of collisionless shocks. As a co-investigator of the co-investigator of Cassini Plasma Spectrometer (CAPS) program, she used the Cassini–Huygens mission to research Saturn and its moons.

=== Selected publications ===
- Young, D. T.; Berthelier, J. J.; Blanc, M.; Burch, J. L.; Coates, A. J.; Goldstein, R.; Grande, M.; Hill, T. W.; Johnson, R. E.; Kelha, V.; Mccomas, D. J.; Sittler, E. C.; Svenes, K. R.; Szegö, K.; Tanskanen, P.; Ahola, K.; Anderson, D.; Bakshi, S.; Baragiola, R. A.; Barraclough, B. L.; Black, R. K.; Bolton, S.; Booker, T.; Bowman, R.; Casey, P.; Crary, F. J.; Delapp, D.; Dirks, G.; Eaker, N.; Funsten, H.; Furman, J. D.; Gosling, J. T.; Hannula, H.; Holmlund, C.; Huomo, H.; Illiano, J. M.; Jensen, P.; Johnson, M. A.; Linder, D. R.; Luntama, T.; Maurice, S.; Mccabe, K. P.; Mursula, K.; Narheim, B. T.; Nordholt, J. E.; Preece, A.; Rudzki, J.; Ruitberg, A.; Smith, K.; Szalai, S.; Thomsen, M. F.; Viherkanto, K.; Vilppola, J.; Vollmer, T.; Wahl, T. E.; Wüest, M.; Ylikorpi, T.; Zinsmeyer, C. (September 2004). "Cassini Plasma Spectrometer Investigation". Space Science Reviews. 114 (1–4): 1–112. Bibcode:2004SSRv..114....1Y. doi:10.1007/s11214-004-1406-4. S2CID 125352558.
- Feldman, W. C.; Anderson, R. C.; Bame, S. J.; Gary, S. P.; Gosling, J. T.; McComas, D. J.; Thomsen, M. F.; Paschmann, G.; Hoppe, M. M. (1983). "Electron velocity distributions near the Earth's bow shock". Journal of Geophysical Research: Space Physics. 88 (A1): 96–110. Bibcode:1983JGR....88...96F. doi:10.1029/JA088iA01p00096.
- Thomsen, M. F.; Reisenfeld, D. B.; Delapp, D. M.; Tokar, R. L.; Young, D. T.; Crary, F. J.; Sittler, E. C.; McGraw, M. A.; Williams, J. D. (2010). "Survey of ion plasma parameters in Saturn's magnetosphere". Journal of Geophysical Research: Space Physics. 115 (A10): n/a. Bibcode:2010JGRA..11510220T. doi:10.1029/2010JA015267.
- Thomsen, M. F. (2004). "Why Kp is such a good measure of magnetospheric convection". Space Weather. 2 (11): n/a. Bibcode:2004SpWea...211004T. doi:10.1029/2004SW000089. S2CID 118639459.

== Awards and honors ==
- Distinguished Alumni Award, University of Iowa (1985)
- Honorary Doctorate in Science, Colorado College (1992)
- Laboratory Fellow, Los Alamos National Laboratory (1997)
- Group Achievement Award, National Aeronautic and Space Administration (1998)
- Fellow, American Geophysical Union (2001)
- Arctowski Medal, National Academy of Sciences (2019)
- John Adam Fleming Medal, American Geophysical Union (2019)
