= Solar Observing Optical Network =

U.S. Air Force solar observatory network

The Solar Observing Optical Network (SOON) consists of three U.S. Air Force (USAF) Air Force Weather Agency (AFWA) solar observatories. AFWA operates a solar telescope at each site to monitor solar active regions at optical wavelengths. The National Geophysical Data Center (NGDC) archives histograms of intensity versus area every minute for the active regions. It also archives magnetograms of the magnetic field structure and tachograms of plasma velocities on an irregular schedule.

The SOON observatories are operated by detachments of AFWA's 2nd Weather Group at the following sites:

- RAAF Learmonth, Western Australia, Australia 22.24180°S 114.08156°E
- Holloman AFB, New Mexico, USA 32.83130°N 106.11646°W
- San Vito dei Normanni Air Station, San Vito dei Normanni, Italy (contractor-run site) 40.64433°N 17.84262°E

Telescopes at Palehua, Hawaii and Ramey Air Force Base, Puerto Rico have been shut down.

SOON Telescope History: The original SOON network was designed by Dr. Richard B. Dunn, a Harvard educated engineer/astrophysicist. Dr. Dunn commissioned the Tower Telescope (later designated the Dunn Solar Tower) on Sacramento Peak, Sunspot, NM in the late 60s. The SOON network of 5 solar telescopes was built at Sunspot for the USAF working with international partners at far flung sites. The Dunn Solar Tower at Sunspot, NM will potentially be idled when the Advanced Technology Solar Telescope, or DKIST, is commissioned on Maui.

There is an active Consolidated Repair Activity (CRA) based out of Holloman Air Force Base, New Mexico which is operated by the 49th Communications Squadron. The CRA provides depot-level maintenance and support to the SOON program. The CRA also develops maintenance procedures, institutes physical (non-software) updates, and overhauls all three telescopes on a regular basis.

== Description ==
The basic SOON telescope is a 25 cm (9.8 in) evacuated refractor mounted on a polar axis. It has a tunable monochromatic filter centered on the hydrogen-alpha absorption line at 6,562.8 ångströms (656.28 nanometers) in the Sun's light spectrum. Shifting the filter's characteristics slightly away from the center of the H-alpha peak results in pictures of the solar surface region at differing depths. Corresponding to the optical images of solar regions are the digital "brightness-area" data. These data are often plotted as brightness-area histograms for a particular time or, in a 3-3-dimensional display, showing a time sequence of changing intensity of optical emissions from areas of solar active regions. The automatic capability of the SOON telescope system allows the rapid collection of this brightness-area information on many active regions on the sun. By using these data, quantitative measures can be determined, include instability, growth/decay rates, and precise dimensions for each active solar region.

== Improved Solar Observing Optical Network ==
The planned Improved Solar Observing Optical Network (ISOON) is intended to replace the current SOON network. As of 2012, ISOON only exists at a single pilot site on Kirtland Air Force Base.

== See also ==
- Radio Solar Telescope Network
- Global Oscillation Network Group
- GOES Solar X-ray Imager
- Synoptic Optical Long-term Investigations of the Sun
