= John W. Harvey =

John W. (Jack) Harvey
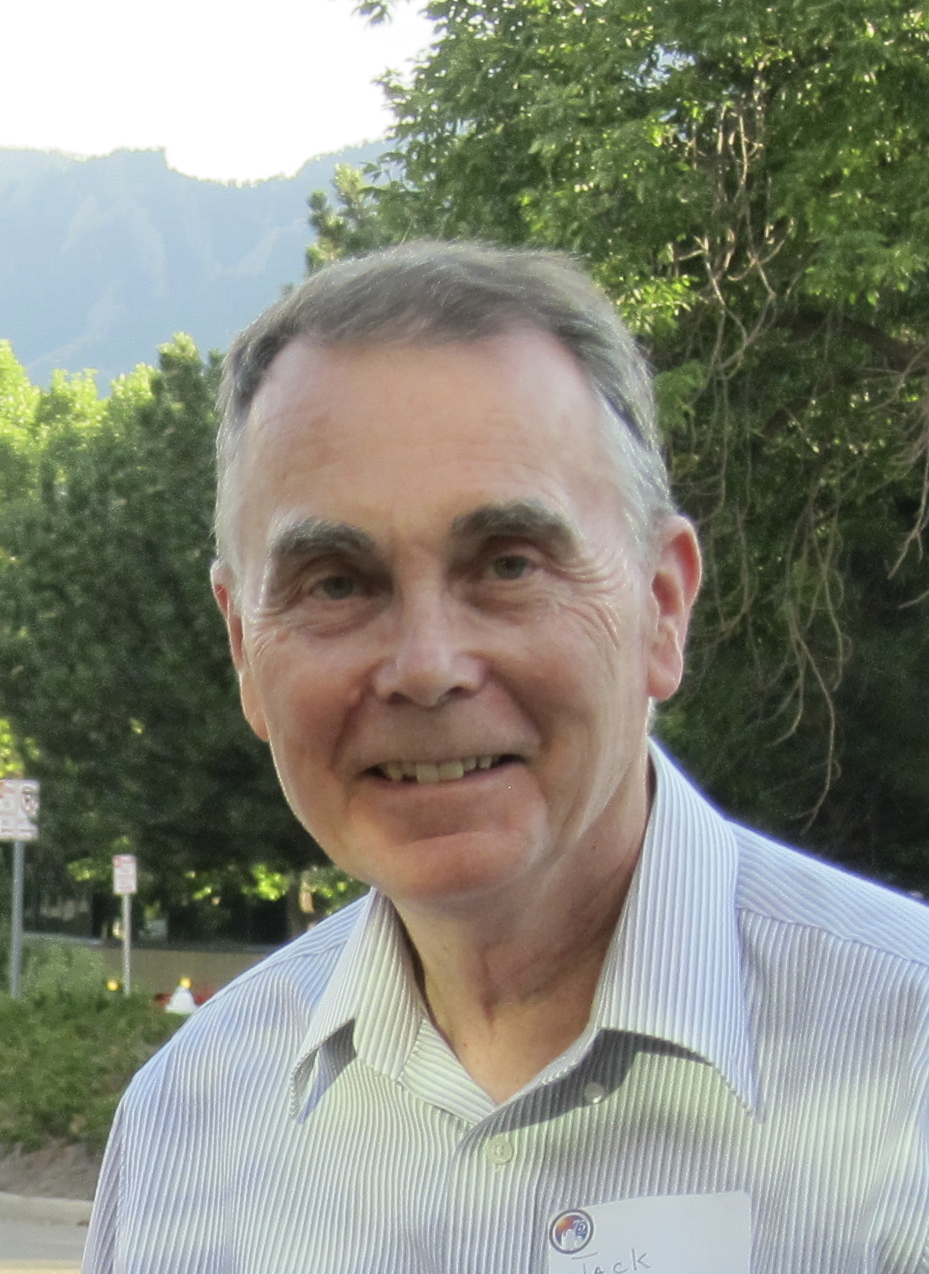
- Citizenship: USA
- Occupation: solar physicist
- Years active: 1969-
- Employer: National Solar Observatory

John W. (Jack) Harvey is a US solar physicist known for his work at the National Solar Observatory, where he started in 1969. He was the Instrument Scientist of the Global Oscillation Network Group (GONG) and the Synoptic Optical Long-term Investigations of the Sun (SOLIS).

Awards and Honors

1990: NASA Exceptional Scientific Achievement Medal
1996: Harvey Summit named in Antarctica.
1999: George Ellery Hale Prize, "for his contributions to the understanding of the Sun".
2003: Minor planet (asteroid) named Johnharvey.
2011: Arctowski Medal of the National Academy of Sciences, for his contributions to the "understanding the Sun's magnetic fields and its interior structure"..
