= Marcia Neugebauer =

American geophysicist

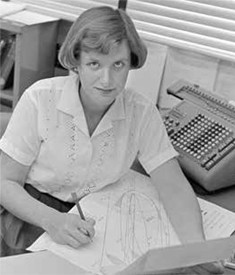
- Circa 1961
- Born: September 27, 1932 (age 94); New York City
- Education: Cornell University
- Known for: Space Physics
- Awards: Arctowski Medal; NASA Distinguished Service Medal
- Scientific career
- Workplaces: NASA

Marcia Neugebauer (born September 27, 1932) is an American geophysicist who made contributions to space physics. Neugebauer's research was among the first that yielded the first direct measurements of the solar wind and shed light on its physics and interaction with comets.

== Career ==
Neugebauer was an investigator of the Mariner 2 plasma analyzer that made the first extensive measurements of the solar wind and discovery of its properties. She also developed analytical instruments that orbited Earth, some set up on the moon by the Apollo astronauts, and others that flew by Halley's Comet on the European Giotto mission.

She participates in many space missions during her long career with NASA and held several management positions at the Jet Propulsion Laboratory, including Manager of the Physics and Space Physics sections, Manager of the Mariner Mark II study team, and project scientist for Rangers 1 and 2 and the Comet Rendezvous Asteroid Flyby mission.

Neugebauer served as president of the American Geophysical Union from 1994 to 1996 and was editor-in-chief of its journal Reviews of Geophysics. She also chaired the National Academy of Sciences' Committee on Solar and Space Physics.

== Awards and honors ==
In 1967 the Museum of Science and Industry named Neugebauer "California Woman Scientist of the Year." She received many awards from NASA, including the Exceptional Scientific Achievement Award, the Outstanding Leadership Medal, and the Distinguished Service Medal (the highest award given by NASA). In 1997 she was inducted in the Women in Technology International Hall of Fame. In 2004 Neugebauer was awarded the William Kaula Award and in 2010 was awarded the Arctowski Medal from the National Academy of Sciences "for definitively establishing the existence of the solar wind, critical to understanding the physics of the heliosphere, and for elucidating many of its key properties."

In 2010 Neugebauer was awarded the George Ellery Hale Prize of the Solar Physics Division of the American Astronomical Society "for her seminal contributions to the discovery of the solar wind and her extensive and ongoing contributions to solar-heliospheric physics."

== Personal life and education ==
Neugebauer was born in New York City. She attended Burr and Burton Academy (then Burr and Burton Seminary) in Manchester, Vermont, where she played basketball and learned how to ski. She received a B.A. in physics from Cornell University in 1954, followed by an M.S. in physics from the University of Illinois in Urbana in 1956. She was awarded an honorary Doctorate of Physics in 1998 by the University of New Hampshire.

She was married to astrophysicist Gerry Neugebauer.
