= Nicholeen Viall =

American solar physicist

Nicholeen Viall is an American solar physicist who is the Chair of the American Astronomical Society's Solar Physics Division. Viall is known for her work on connecting dynamics of the solar corona to dynamics of the solar wind, based on observed variability of the corona-heliosphere system with both remote-sensing instruments and in-situ probes, and for her work on understanding evolution of the plasma in the inner heliosphere. She is the mission scientist for NASA's PUNCH mission, and a co-investigator on the ISS/CODEX and Parker Solar Probe/WISPR coronal imaging instruments. Since March 2012, she has worked at the Goddard Space Flight Center as a research astrophysicist.

== Education ==
Viall graduated from the University of Washington in 2004 with a Bachelors of Science in Astronomy and Physics. She received her Master of Arts in Astronomy at Boston University in 2007 and PhD in 2010. She is a graduate of Kentwood High School.

== Honors and awards ==
- 2023: Eddington Lecturer at the University of Cambridge and Royal Astronomical Society meetings
- 2018: Winner of the AAS/SPD Karen Harvey Prize for significant contributions to the field of solar physics early in a person's professional career, "for her fundamental contributions to understanding coronal heating and the slow solar wind, and for her valuable service to the science community and the general public".
- 2018: Awarded the NASA Early Career Achievement Medal for "fundamental contributions to understanding coronal heating and the slow solar wind and for valuable service to NASA, the science community, and the public".
