= John T. Gosling =

American physicist (1938–2018)

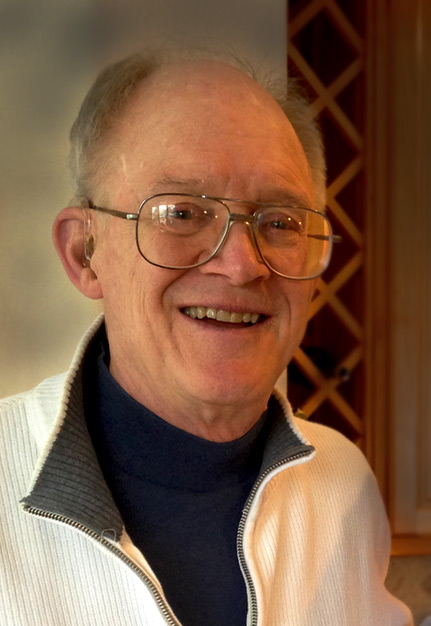
Photo of Jack Gosling taken May 11, 2014

John T. Gosling (July 10, 1938 – May 10, 2018) was an American physicist, whose research in heliophysics focused on the large-scale structure and magnetic topology of the solar wind, coronal mass ejections, solar wind and geomagnetic disturbances, magnetic reconnection, collisionless shocks, and particle acceleration in space. Gosling most recently performed research at University of Colorado and was an Elected Fellow of the American Association for the Advancement of Science.

Gosling was awarded the John Adam Fleming Medal at the AGU Spring Meeting Honors Ceremony, which was held on June 2, 2000, in Washington, D.C. The medal recognizes original research and technical leadership in geomagnetism, atmospheric electricity, aeronomy, space physics, and related sciences.

Gosling was a member of the American Geophysical Union, American Physical Society, International Astronomical Union, and American Association for Advancement of Science.

John T. Gosling died from cancer in Louisville, Colorado on May 10, 2018, at the age of 79.

== Awards and honors ==
- Technology Achievement Award - National Center for Atmospheric Research, 1974
- Distinguished Performance Award (Individual), Los Alamos National Laboratory, 1988
- Elected Fellow, American Geophysical Union, 1991
- Elected Fellow, Los Alamos National Laboratory, 1992
- Distinguished Performance Award (Large Team), Los Alamos National Laboratory, 1994
- Editors' Citation for Excellence in Refereeing:
  - Journal of Geophysical Research – 1992, 1994, 1997
  - Geophysical Research Letters – 1995, 2008
  - Reviews of Geophysics – 2000
- John Adam Fleming Medal, American Geophysical Union, 2000
- Institute for Scientific Information recognition as one of the most highly cited researchers in space sciences – 2002
- Parker/Bowie Lecture, American Geophysical Union, May, 2004.
- Elected Fellow, American Association for Advancement of Science, 2007

== Education ==
- 1956: Graduated from Buchtel High School, Akron, Ohio.
- 1960: B. S. Physics (magna cum laude), Ohio University
- 1965: Ph.D. Physics, University of California - Berkeley

== Professional work history ==
- 1965–1967: Post-doctoral staff member, Los Alamos Scientific Laboratory,
- 1967–1975: Scientific Staff Member, High Altitude Observatory, National Center for Atmospheric Research
- 1975–1992: Staff Member, Los Alamos National Laboratory
- 1992–2005: Laboratory Fellow, Los Alamos National Laboratory
- 1994–1998: Team Leader, Space Plasma Physics, Los Alamos National Laboratory
- 2005–2018: Senior Research Associate, Laboratory for Atmospheric and Space Physics, University of Colorado, Boulder
- 2005–2018: Consultant to Southwest Research Institute
