= Solar Physics Division =

The Solar Physics Division of the American Astronomical Society (AAS/SPD) or (AAS-SPD), often referred to as simply the "Solar Physics Division" (SPD), is the primary trade organization of solar physicists in the U.S. It exists for the advancement of the study of the Sun and to coordinate of such research with other branches of science. SPD organizes meetings and certain solar-physics-specific prizes, occasionally advocates for solar physics in the political arena, and promotes outreach via formal and informal educational projects.

The SPD awards the George Ellery Hale Prize for outstanding contributions over an extended period of time to solar astronomy, and the Karen Harvey Prize for a significant contribution to the study of the Sun early in a scientist's professional career. The SPD also gives popular writing awards, and holds a student poster contest at its meetings. Contestants are judged on readability, flow, quality of appearance and proportion of independent work done by the student. Judges also take into account the oral presentation by the student, how well the conclusions line up with the aim or purpose and the overall quality of the work.
