= David Dunlap Observatory =

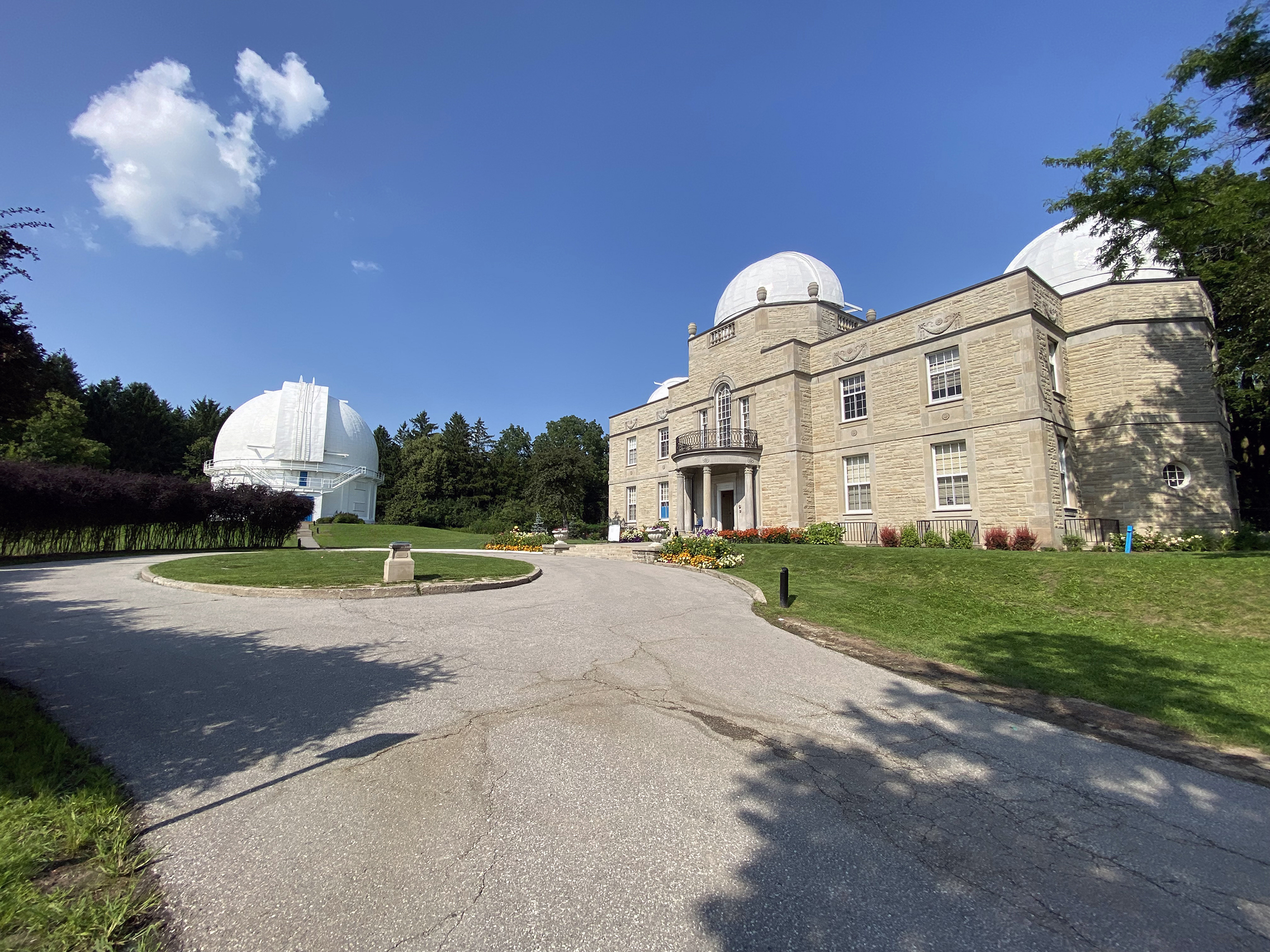
- The 74-inch (1.9 m) telescope (left) and Administration Building (right) at the David Dunlap Observatory
- Alternative names: DDO
- Named after: David Alexander Dunlap
- Organization: University of Toronto (1935–2008); Royal Astronomical Society of Canada (2009–2016); City of Richmond Hill (2018–)
- Observatory code: 779
- Location: Richmond Hill, Ontario, Canada
- Coordinates: 43°51′46″N 79°25′22″W
- Altitude: 224 m (735 ft)
- Weather: 67% clear nights
- Established: 31 May 1935
- Website: richmondhill.ca/ddo

Telescopes
- Telescope 1: 1.88 m reflector
- Telescope 2: 0.6 m Cassegrain
- Telescope 3: 0.5 m Cassegrain
- Related media on Commons

National Historic Site of Canada
- Official name: David Dunlap Observatory National Historic Site of Canada
- Designated: 31 July 2019

The David Dunlap Observatory (DDO) is an astronomical observatory site in Richmond Hill, Ontario, Canada. Established in 1935, it was owned and operated by the University of Toronto until 2008. It was then acquired by the city of Richmond Hill, which provides a combination of heritage preservation, unique recreation opportunities and a celebration of the astronomical history of the site. Its primary instrument is a 74-inch (1.88 m) reflector telescope, at one time the second-largest telescope in the world, and still the largest in Canada. Several other telescopes are also located at the site, which formerly also included a small radio telescope. The telescope was driven by the vision of astronomer Clarence Chant, shared by businessman David Alexander Dunlap – whose family provided financial support after Dunlap's death in 1924. The scientific legacy of the David Dunlap Observatory continues in the Dunlap Institute for Astronomy & Astrophysics, a research institute at the University of Toronto established in 2008.

The DDO is the site of a number of important scientific studies, including pioneering measurements of the distance to globular clusters, providing the first direct evidence that Cygnus X-1 was a black hole, and the discovery that Polaris was stabilizing and appeared to be "falling out" of the Cepheid variable category. Located on a hill, yet still relatively close to sea level at 730 feet (220 m) altitude, and now surrounded by urban settlement, its optical astronomy ability has been reduced as compared to other remote observatory sites around the world. On 31 July 2019, the DDO was accepted by the National Historic Board as a National Historic Site of Canada.

== History ==
=== Genesis ===
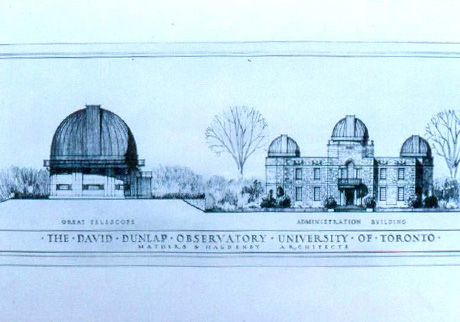
Concept sketch of David Dunlap Observatory

The DDO owes its existence almost entirely to the efforts of Clarence Chant. Chant had not shown an early interest in astronomy, but while attending University College, University of Toronto, he became interested in mathematics and physics, eventually joining the university as a lecturer in physics in 1892. Over the next several years he worked as a schoolteacher and civil servant. During a later leave of absence he earned his PhD from Harvard University and did postdoctoral work in Germany.

Chant joined the Astronomical and Physical Society of Toronto in December 1892; it was renamed the Royal Astronomical Society of Canada in 1902. Chant became president of the Society, serving between 1904 and 1907. Throughout the 1890s, Chant was concerned about how little the university did for astronomy, and in 1904 he proposed adding several undergraduate courses for fourth-year students, and six such courses were added to the 1905 calendar.

With courses now officially on the books, Chant started looking for a proper telescope. Previously the university had hosted the Toronto Magnetic and Meteorological Observatory, which had been run by the Meteorological Office of the Ministry of Marine and Fisheries. The observatory, built in 1840, had contained the high-quality 6-inch (150 mm) Cooke Refractor, but the Observatory was now surrounded by new university buildings, rendering it useless for astronomy. The Meteorological Office had already decided to abandon the site and turn the building over to the university, but they were taking the telescope to their new location at 315 Bloor Street West. Even if the university had been able to secure time on the instrument, which was highly likely, it was at this time quite a small instrument in comparison to those being built around the world.

The same problem of encroachment that had led to the observatory falling into disuse led Chant to conclude that there was no suitable location on the university grounds for a new observatory, and he started looking for off-campus sites. While looking, he started getting quotes for a new instrument from Warner & Swasey in Cleveland, Ohio, who had provided the mount for the recently opened Dominion Observatory in Ottawa. In 1910 Chant finally found a suitable location, a 10-acre (4.0 ha) plot of land near what is today Bathurst Street and St. Clair Avenue. The land had originally been set aside by the city for the Isolation Hospital, but this was never constructed and it now lay empty. Chant convinced the city to become involved in the Royal Astronomical Observatory, but lack of funds and the outbreak of World War I put the project on hold, and in 1919 it was cancelled outright.

=== Dunlap involvement ===
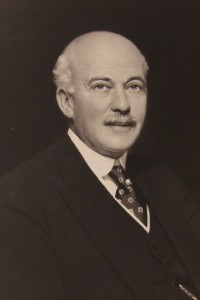
David Alexander Dunlap, c. 1920

Knowing that similar funding collaborations had been very successful in the United States, Chant turned to the local business community. To promote his plan, Chant often concluded public lectures with a pitch to the audience for a larger observatory for Toronto; this included a 1921 talk on Comet 7P/Pons-Winnecke, which had recently been visible in Canada. One of the attendees was Hollinger Mines co-founder, lawyer David Dunlap (1863–1924), who expressed an interest in Chant's efforts to build a large observatory. However, before making any financial commitment, Dunlap died in October 1924 at age 61 (also see 70207 Davidunlap). In late 1926, Chant wrote to his widow, Jessie Dunlap, with the idea of erecting an observatory as a monument to her husband. Mrs. Dunlap promised to "keep it in [her] heart for consideration, for it appeals to me tremendously."

By this point the chosen site was within the rapidly-growing city, and not suitable for astronomy due to both light pollution. A site much further from the city was needed, to ensure it too would not be crowded out, as well as to reduce the impact of moisture-filled air and fog from Lake Ontario. The first site studied was outside Aurora, Ontario, but it was decided that it was too far from the university for casual travel. Another site near Hogg's Hollow was also studied, but was not easily accessible. The eventual site was selected while Chant was studying topographical maps with fellow astronomer Reynold K. Young, finding a suitable spot north of the city. The site was a short distance east of Yonge Street, and the Canadian Northern Ontario Railway line ran along the western end of the site. It was on Lot 42 on what was Alexander Marsh's farm and orchard. In 1930, when Chant took Dunlap to see the site for the first time, she stated "this is the place!" and authorized its purchase for CA$28,000 (equivalent to $505,000 in 2025).

=== Construction ===
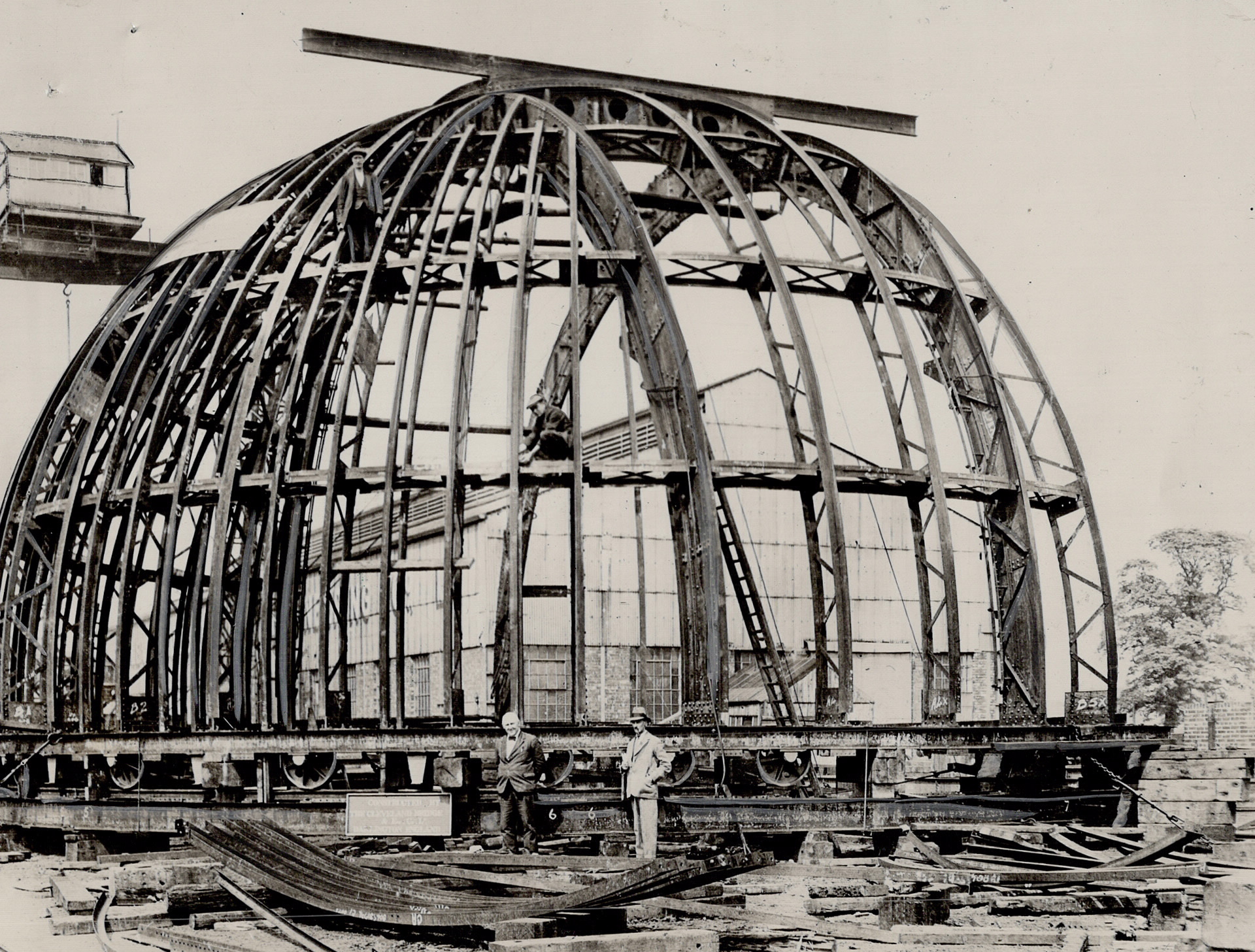
Construction of the observatory's dome in Newcastle upon Tyne, after which it was dismantled and shipped to Richmond Hill

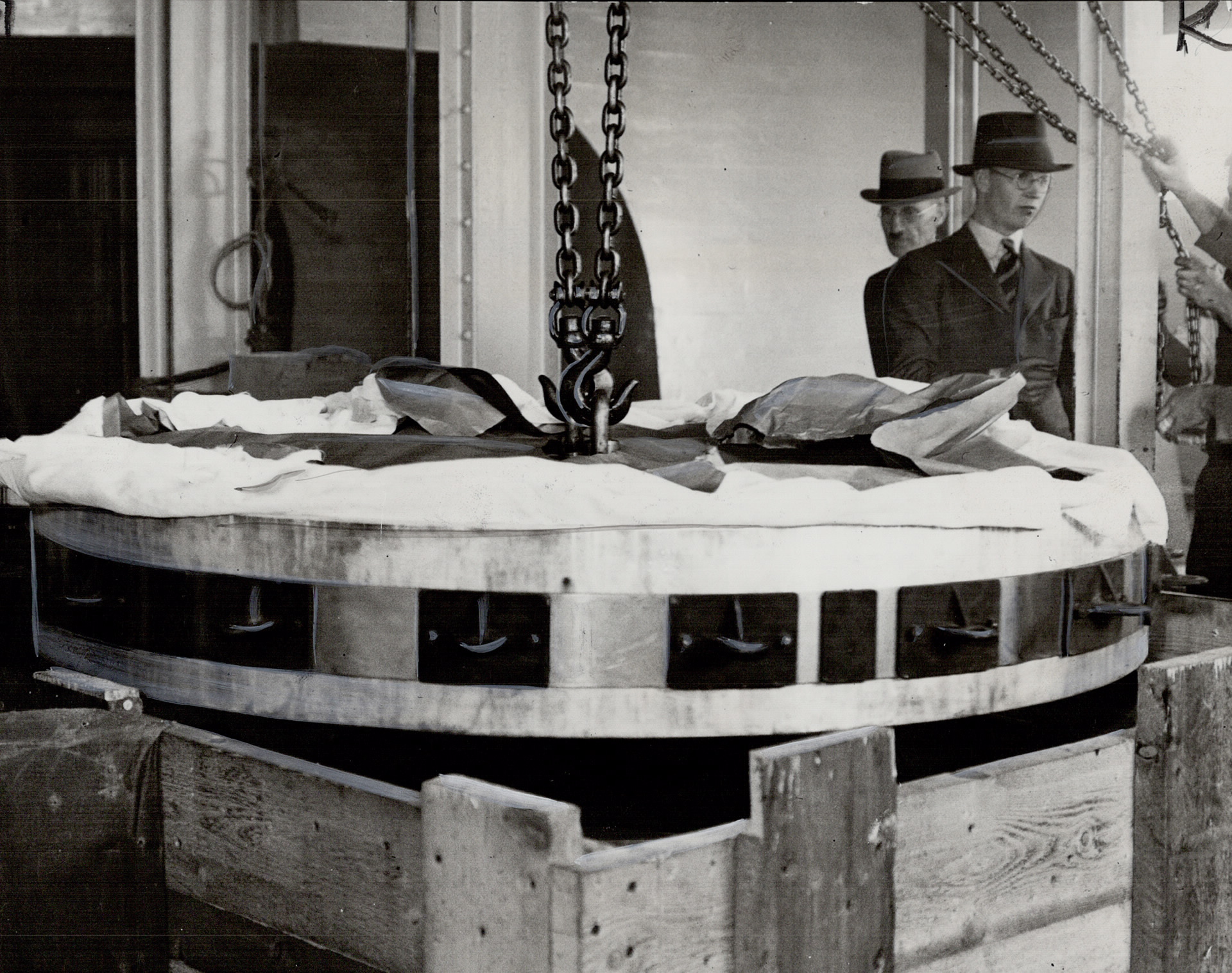
Installation of the mirror

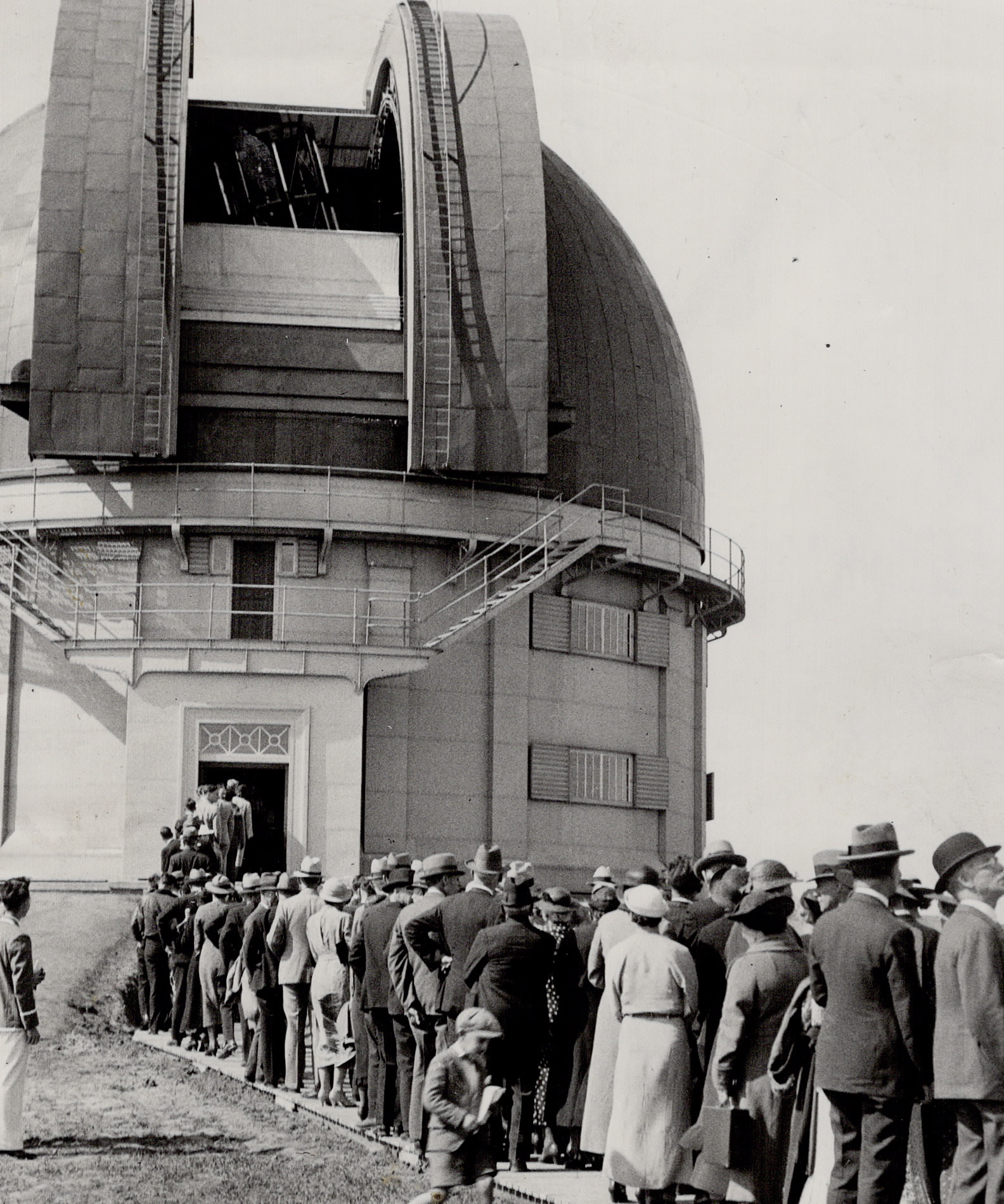
Queue at the observatory in 1935, when guests were invited to inspect the telescope

Chant immediately ordered a telescope, selecting a 74-inch (1.9 m) instrument from Grubb, Parsons and Company in England. This would make it the second-largest telescope in the world, second only to the 100-inch (2.5 m) instrument at Mount Wilson Observatory. It was, however, only slightly larger than the one that had recently gone into service for the Dominion Astrophysical Observatory in British Columbia, at 72 inches (1.8 m). The eighty-ton sixty-one-foot (18.6 m) copper dome and cylindrical walls of the observatory building were constructed by the Cleveland Bridge and Engineering Co. of Darlington, UK, with the mechanical parts supplied by Grubb & Parsons. The parts of the building and telescope arrived in Toronto in 1933 and were reassembled on site. The administration building, a few hundred feet from the main observatory, was designed by Toronto architectural firm Mathers & Haldenby. The 76-inch (1.9 m) mirror blank (the two outermost inches (5 cm) of the mirror are not used) was supplied by Corning Incorporated and cast in Pyrex from a batch of glass that Corning also used to produce the 200-inch (5.1 m) mirror for Palomar Observatory. Chant and Mrs. Dunlap attended the pouring of the mirror at the factory in Corning, New York in June 1933. The mirror was annealed, then shipped to Grubb-Parsons in England for polishing. The telescope was completed in time for the finished mirror's return in May 1935.

The official opening was on 31 May 1935, Chant's 70th birthday. The opening ceremony was attended by notables including Sir Frank Dyson, former Astronomer Royal, and former Prime Minister William Lyon Mackenzie King, who praised the Observatory as "a gift to science all over the world". Reynold K. Young was named the first director of the DDO. Chant retired the same day and moved into Observatory House, the original pre-Confederation farmhouse (built in 1864 for Alexander Marsh and known also as Elms Lea Alexander Marsh) just to the south of the administration buildings, where he spent his remaining years. In May 1939, the train carrying King George VI and Queen Elizabeth on their cross-Canada tour paused on the railway below the observatory, the largest telescope in the commonwealth.

Grubb-Parsons built four more 1.88-metre telescopes with similarities to the instrument in Richmond Hill: for Radcliffe Observatory near Pretoria, Mount Stromlo Observatory in Australia, Helwan Observatory in Egypt, and an observatory in Okayama Prefecture in Japan. The South African instrument was disassembled and moved to Sutherland, Northern Cape in the 1970s because of light pollution. The original telescope mirror at Helwan was replaced by Zeiss in 1997, and the telescope at Mount Stromlo was destroyed by fire in 2003. A 1.93-metre Grubb-Parsons telescope at Haute-Provence Observatory with a higher-resolution spectrograph was used to discover an extrasolar planet orbiting the star 51 Pegasi in 1995.

The three smaller domes at the top of the DDO administration building are used for smaller instruments. Soon after the observatory opened in 1935, a 50-centimetre (20 in) Cassegrain reflector telescope was installed in the southern dome. A large vacuum tank was constructed, then used to aluminize the 74-inch mirror in 1941. The 6-inch (150 mm) Cooke Refractor had been out of use since the Meteorological Office had given it to Hart House, but it was little used and was moved into the northern dome in 1951 to be used by undergraduates. In 1965, a similar 60-centimetre (24 in) Cassegrain was added to the central dome.

=== Operations ===
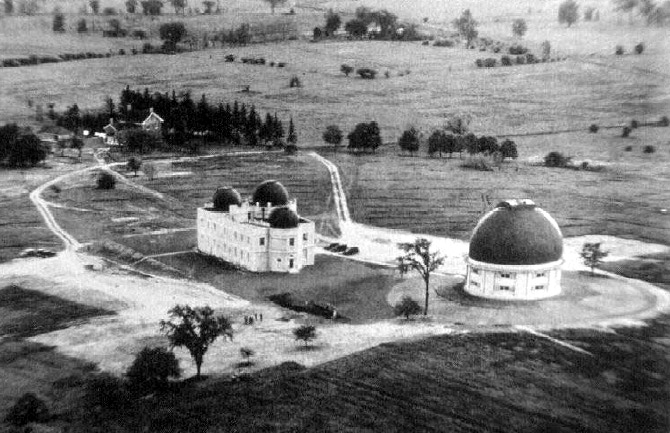
The view of David Dunlap Observatory in 1935. Observatory House is visible in the upper left.

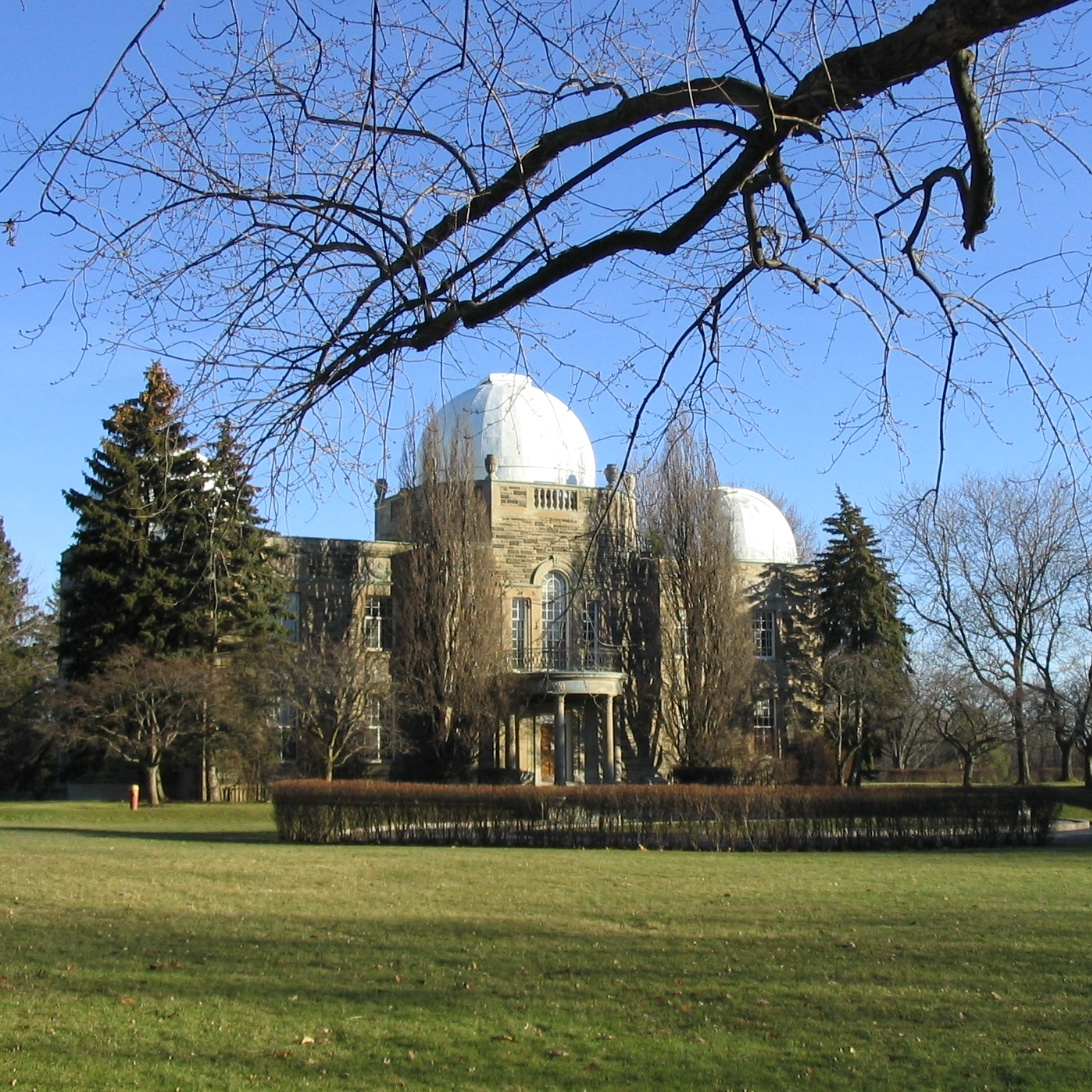
The administration building, with two of the observatory's telescopes built on top. The building's third dome is just out of sight behind the trees on the left.

From 1946 to 1951 the observatory director was Frank Scott Hogg, who was joined at the DDO by his wife Helen Sawyer Hogg. After her husband's death, Helen continued at the observatory, surveying globular clusters to gauge their distance, publishing a major catalog of variable stars in clusters. Her weekly 'With the Stars' column in the Toronto Star was published from 1951 to 1981. In 1959 and 1966 staff astronomer Sidney van den Bergh composed a database of dwarf galaxies known as the David Dunlap Observatory Catalogue.

In collaboration with the Department of Electrical Engineering, Donald MacRae established a radio astronomy observatory on the observatory grounds in 1956. The DDO work led to the 1963 measurement of the absolute flux density of Cassiopeia A at 320 MHz, a radiometric standard. The DDO also built an 18-metre (59 ft) radio telescope in Algonquin Park in northern Ontario, co-locating it at the site of the larger Algonquin Radio Observatory. This instrument was actively used until 1991, when budget cuts led to it being abandoned. It was later used by a private group as part of a SETI project, Project TARGET, and has reported moved to a site outside Shelburne, Ontario.

In 1960 observatory operations formed the narrative framework of the National Film Board (NFB) short film Universe. The film was nominated for the 33rd Academy Awards in the category of best documentary, short subject in 1961. Universe was shown at the 1964 New York World's Fair where it was seen by Stanley Kubrick and Arthur C. Clarke, who were starting work on the film that eventually became 2001: A Space Odyssey. Universe featured future DDO director Donald MacRae and was narrated by Stanley Jackson.

Tom Bolton was hired as a postdoctoral fellow at the DDO in 1970. In 1971 he used data from the Uhuru X-ray observatory, and Naval Research Laboratory sounding rockets launched from White Sands Missile Range to find the optical companion star to the X-ray source Cygnus X-1. Those X-ray telescopes had a certain degree of accuracy, but follow-up optical-wavelength studies of possible companions were required to eliminate a shortlist of many stars in the same area of sky. Bolton observed the star HDE 226868 independently of the work by Louise Webster and Paul Murdin, at the Royal Greenwich Observatory, who could not prove that star was Cygnus X-1's optical companion. The high dispersion of the 74-inch (1.9 m) telescope's spectrograph, combined with the 74-inch (1.9 m) aperture was adequate to prove the star was the source of the X-ray emissions and that its behaviour was inconsistent with a normal eclipsing star.

=== Shifting locations ===
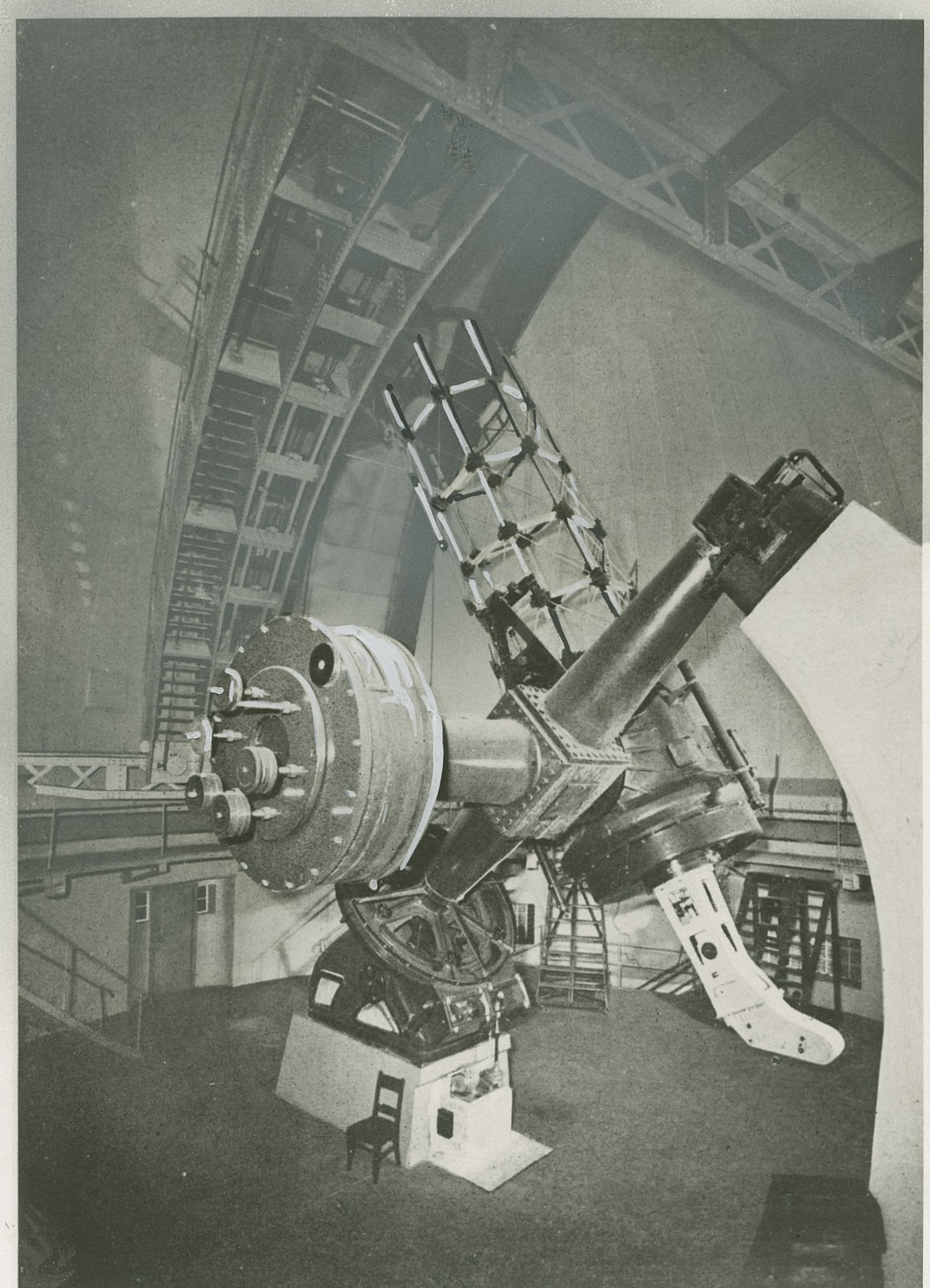
David Dunlap Observatory in 1948

With the rapid growth of university funding in the 1960s more offices were being built in the downtown campus, and with the opening of the McLennan Labs more and more of the department moved into the new facilities. The Administration Building at the DDO headquartered the Astronomy Department until the 1960s, although the weekly department meetings continued to be held there until 1978. The main library was shifted downtown in 1983. The Cooke Refractor, now almost unused, was later donated to the Canada Science and Technology Museum in 1984.

The main reflector at the DDO remained a major instrument into the 1960s, but in the end even the "remote" location Chant had selected was being encroached on by urban sprawl. Although some consideration was given to moving the telescope to a new site, in the end it was decided the funds would be better spent on a smaller instrument in a much better location. This led to the building of a 60-centimetre (24 in) instrument at Las Campanas in Chile in 1971, creating the University of Toronto Southern Observatory (UTSO). It was at this location that University of Toronto telescope operator Ian Shelton discovered Supernova 1987A, the first supernova visible to the naked eye in more than 350 years. The UTSO was closed in 1997 to re-allocate funds to a share of the Gemini Observatory, and the 60-centimetre (24 in) telescope was moved to El Leoncito in Argentina, where the university has a 25% share in observation time. While University operations continued at the DDO, international observers used about 50% of observing time there.

=== Closure, sale, redevelopment and reopening ===
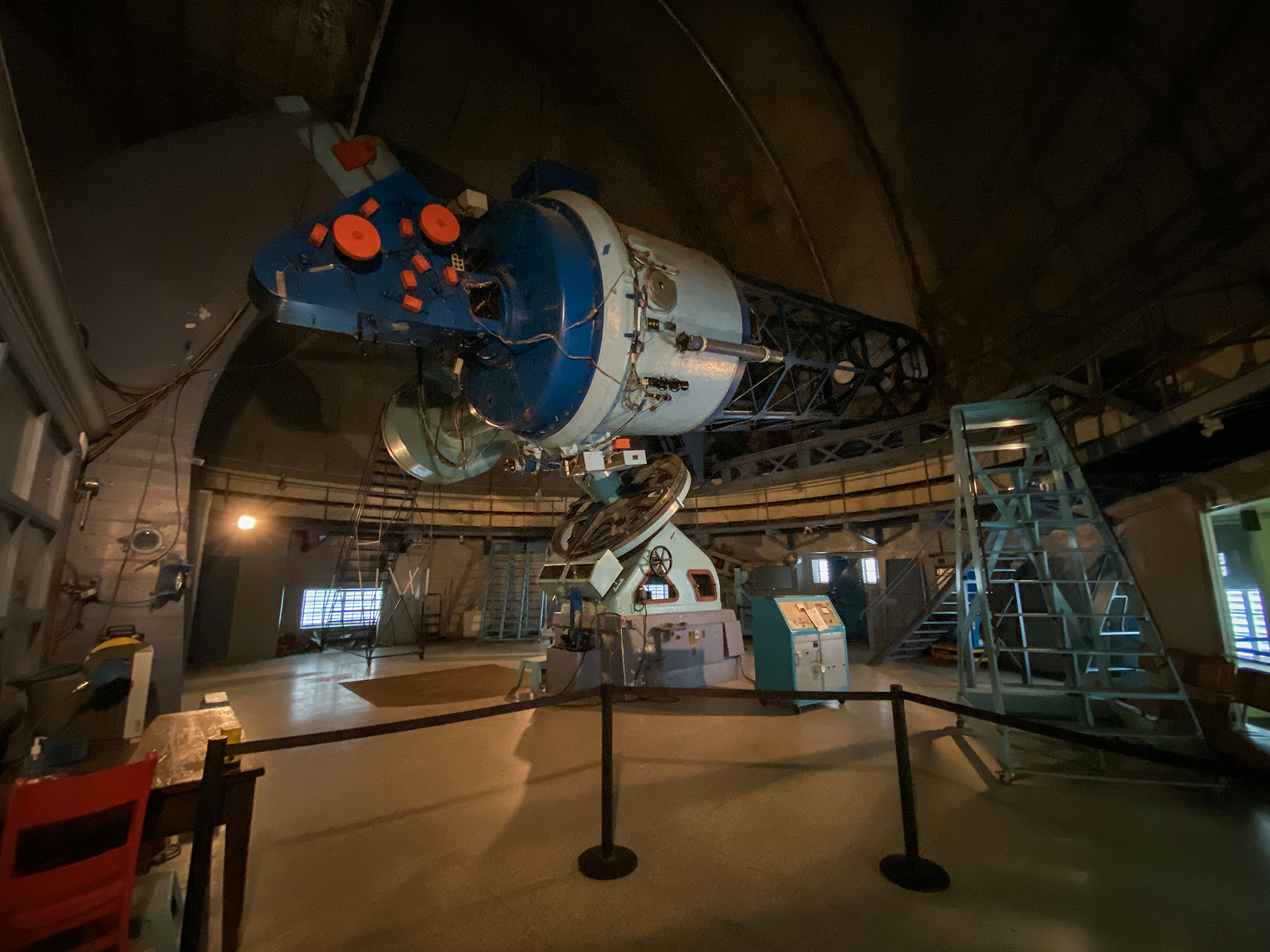
Observatory Dome inside

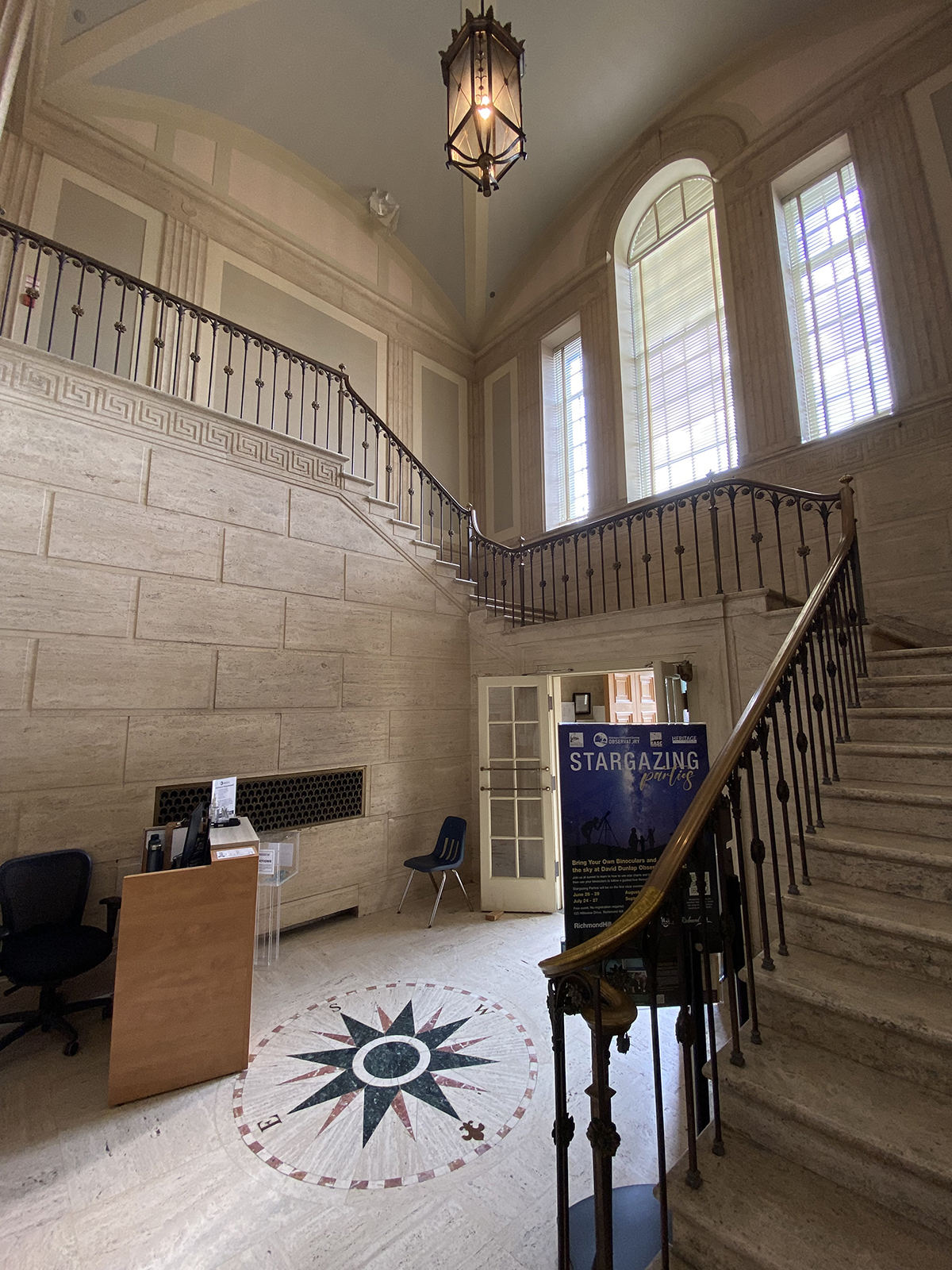
Administration Building foyer

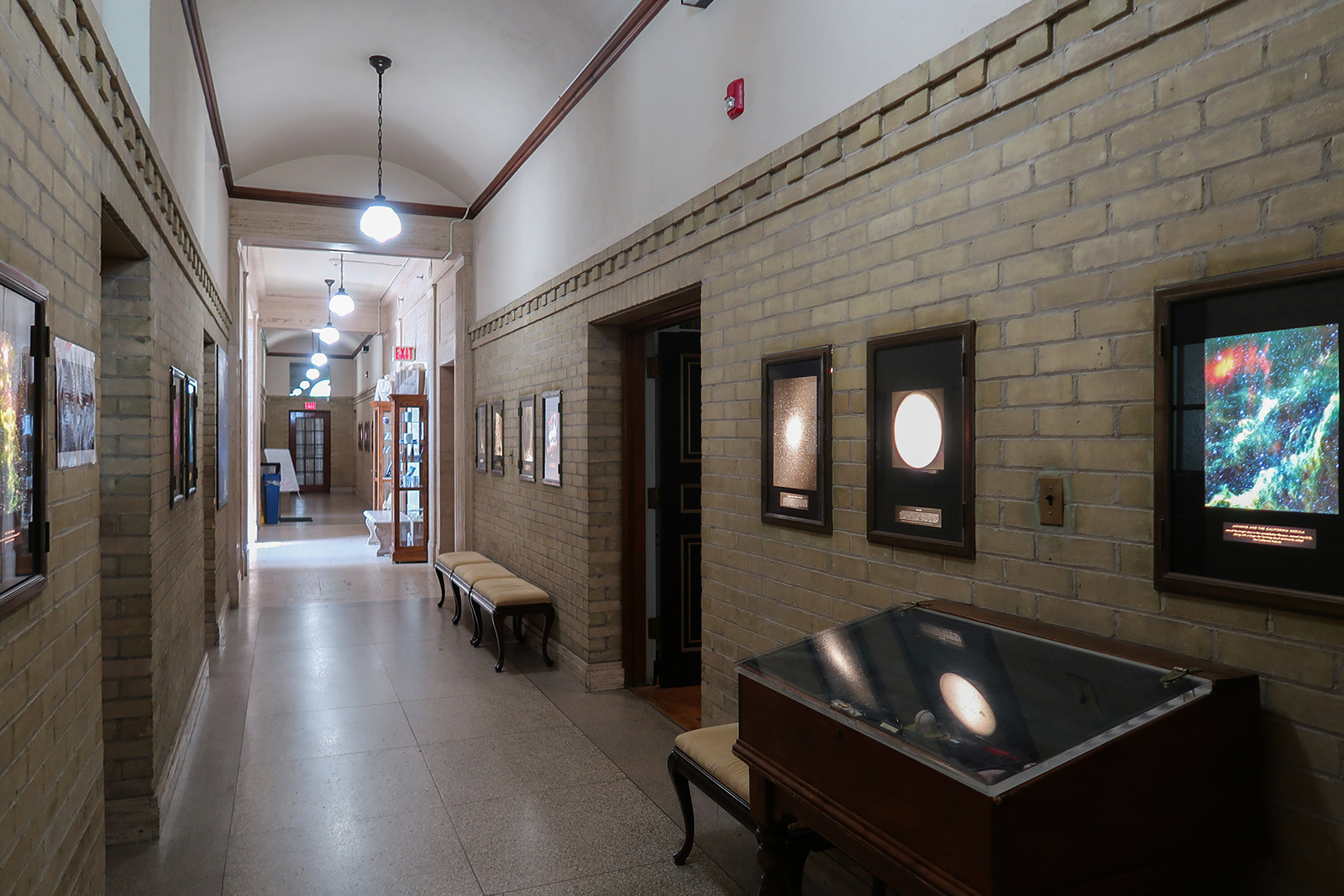
Administration Building Level 1 access

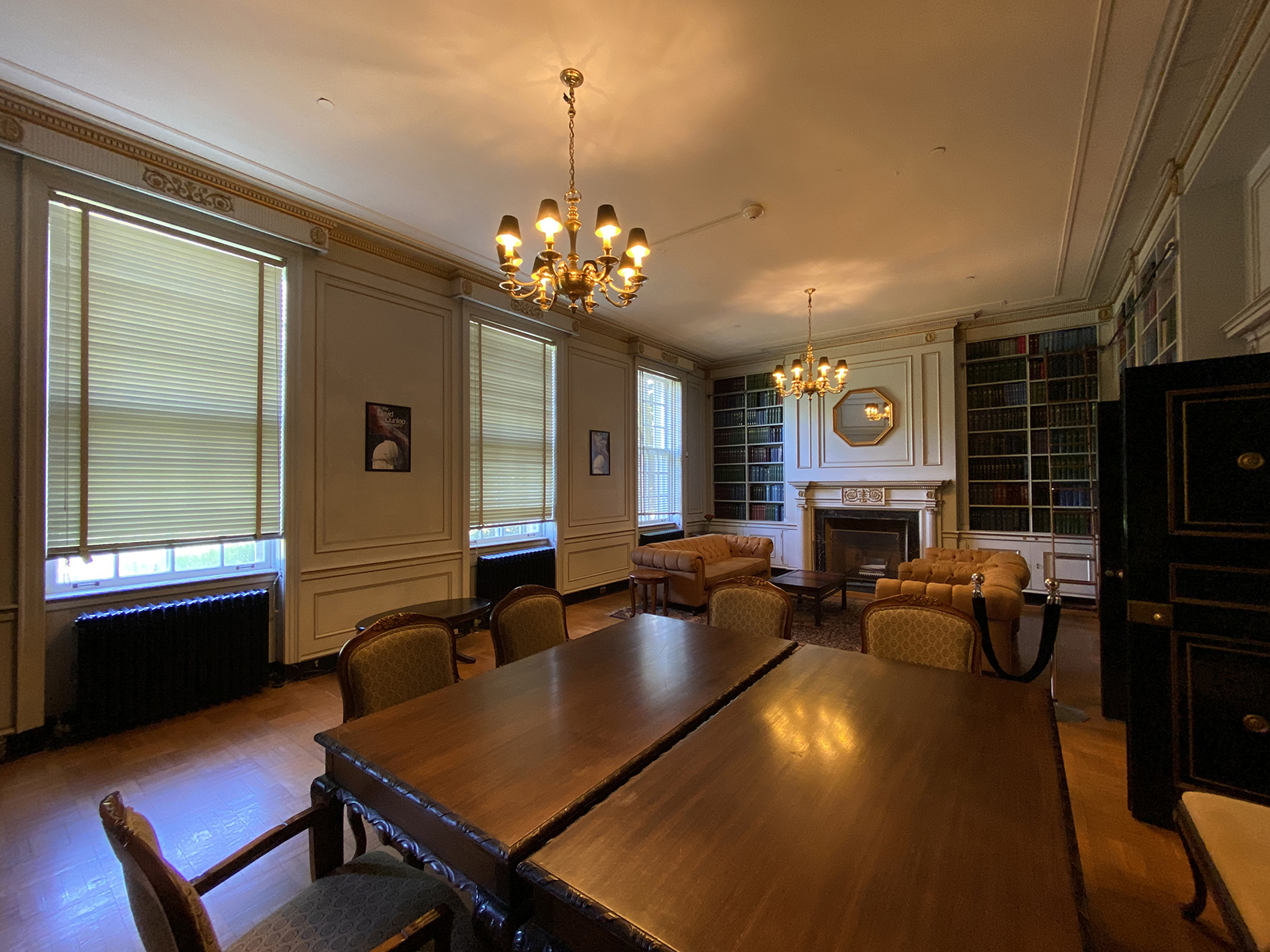
Administration Building Library

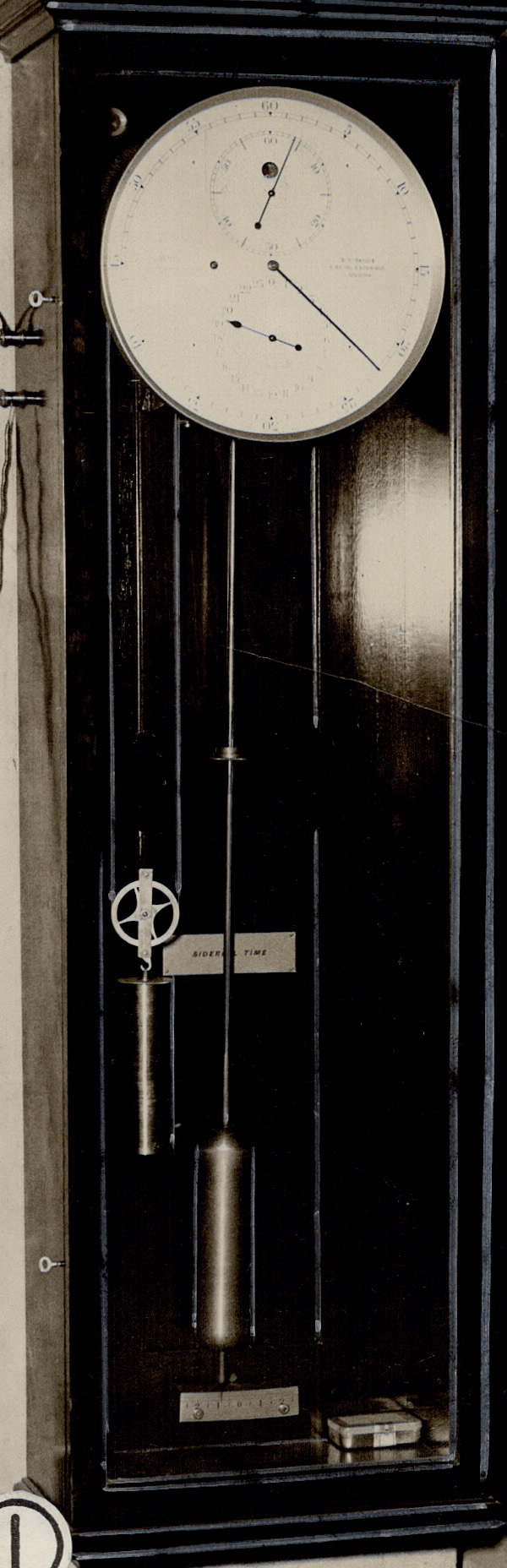
Clock at Dunlap Observatory

By the mid-1990s, the observatory remained the largest single-mirror site in Canada, but it was considered small by modern standards. The cutting edge of Canadian university astronomy studies was involved in some of the world's largest observatories: the James Clerk Maxwell Telescope, the Canada-France-Hawaii Telescope, the Atacama Large Millimeter Array and the Gemini Observatory. None of these telescopes are located in Canada. After the UTSO was closed, in 1998 the Canadian Astronomical Society, a society of university astronomers, published a long range plan emphasizing the study of the origins of structure in the universe, a task well-suited to cutting-edge telescopes but ill-suited to the DDO. The long-range plan suggested the future of observatories such as the DDO lay in public outreach programs and training. In 2005 Canadian universities joined a partnership to build the Thirty Meter Telescope, expected to cost more than $1 billion.

In September 2007, the university stated it planned to sell the DDO property owing to light pollution.

The university's governing council voted on the issue during the week of 1 November 2007, and agreed to sell the site to the highest bidder. The 75 hectares (190 acres) of land in the midst of a very large subdivision area was expected to fetch $100 million, some of which the university planned to use to found a Dunlap Institute to continue astronomical research. For the purposes of the sale, the land was partitioned into a 71 ha (180-acre) Parcel A and a 5 ha (12-acre) Parcel B (also known as the 'panhandle'), upon which sits the Elvis Stojko Arena and a park with a 200-metre-wide solar system art piece. The land upon which the arena was built was leased to the Town until the Town purchased the 'panhandle' lands in 2012.

At the end of June 2008, the university completed the sale of both parcels of the property to Corsica Development Inc., a subsidiary of Metrus Development Inc. for $70 million, a lower price than expected. Observatory staff were laid off and faculty reassigned to the downtown St. George campus. The Town of Richmond Hill planned a hearing with the Conservation Review Board of Ontario to argue for protection of the western 48% of the property including the observatory buildings under the Ontario Heritage Act; at the hearing, the Richmond Hill Naturalists argued for 100% designation of the property, all the buildings and their contents, and the Observatory Hill Homeowners Association argued for the protection of the heritage woodlots and arboretums. Corsica Development Inc. was also represented before the CRB. Preliminary hearings took place on 3 September and 15 October 2008. Corsica Development Inc. is administered by Metrus in conjunction with The Conservatory Group and Marel Contracting. At the same time, the RASC-TC were selected over the DDOD to manage and operate the observatory.

The Conservation Review Board hearing to determine the extent of the Cultural Heritage Landscape designation to be afforded to the Dunlap site took place in Richmond Hill between 15 and 23 January 2009, and the Board recommendation was published on 4 June. The Board recommended preservation of the observatory buildings and up to 80% of the property as a cultural heritage landscape. On 29 September 2009, Richmond Hill Town Council voted unanimously in favour of the designating by-law. The Town proceeded with a number of public meetings and reports in late 2009 to craft guidelines for the conservation, planning and design of the property. Corsica Development Inc. undertook an archaeological survey of the property. On 15 April 2010, stemming from an incident on the property in November 2009, Corsica Development Inc. pleaded guilty in York Region court to 17 counts of cutting a tree without a permit and was issued a fine of $44,880. The company also planted 100 new trees on the property as part of the judgment.

In January 2009, Corsica published the website observatoryhill.ca describing the property, stating, "[We] are in the process of looking for an astronomy club to occupy the observatory and welcome proposals for consideration." On 22 April 2009, Corsica and the Royal Astronomical Society of Canada announced an agreement allowing the RASC to provide public education and outreach programs at the observatory, and to operate the 1.88m telescope. On 14 June, the RASC Toronto Centre published the website www.theddo.ca, to make tickets available for public astronomy nights at the observatory starting on 18 July. Astronomy events at the observatory continued, such as Perseid meteor shower events that drew high attendance and media coverage. These new operations continued through 2016, combined with opportunities such as use of the observatory for location shoots of the Syfy (formerly Sci-Fi Channel) series Warehouse 13 and the NBC television series Hannibal.

In May 2013, after continued debate and appeals for mediation between the town of Richmond Hill and Metrus/Corsica, the Ontario Municipal Board handed down a decision to support official plan amendment 270, the mediated settlement that set aside 56 percent of the site's land to residents for a future public park. Corsica would be allowed to build 530 homes on the eastern portion of the site. Combined with the previous purchase by the Town of Richmond Hill of the Elvis Stojko Arena and surrounding land for $19.5 million, a total of 11 acres of the original 189-acre property is owned by the town. A further legal appeal by the Richmond Hill Naturalists to preserve the entire site from development was launched in August 2013 and was ultimately unsuccessful. The group was eventually ordered to pay some of the developers' court costs in September 2015.

In November 2014, the David Dunlap Observatory Defenders group chairperson and founder Karen Cilevitz resigned from her position after being elected to be local councillor for the region's Ward (Ward 5). The organization then formed a new group, the Friends of the David Dunlap Observatory Park, to function as the public stakeholder entity for site advocacy, public engagement and community outreach. In response, in December 2014 both the RASC-TC and the DDOD published editorial letters in the Richmond Hill Liberal, both claiming to be the "true" parties responsible for upkeep and operation of the Observatory.

In April 2015, Corsica (having changed their name to DG Group) announced plans to transfer ownership of the observatory buildings to the RASC. Despite RASC-TC's status as a registered charitable corporation, some parties to the 2012 five-party OMB settlement argued that the donation placed the future of the observatory in doubt, because RASC was not a government agency. In March 2016, the dispute was resolved through transfer of ownership of the property to the town of Richmond Hill.

On 20 July 2016, the RASC-TC declined to continue negotiations to lease the property for exclusive use and to continue to provide outreach programs at the heritage site. This led to the Town inviting proposals from 35 organizations to continue programming and maintenance of the site. Five applicants submitted proposals, including the York Region Astronomical Association (members of the RASC-TC who had been using, maintaining and programming the site), the RASC-TC, and the DDOD.

In October 2016, the Town of Richmond Hill approved a master plan to turn 40 hectares (99 acres) of the Observatory lands into a "destination park", for astronomical outreach programs, while adding recreational amenities such as walking paths, 4 tennis courts, an amphitheatre and a low-light level "Star Path" self-illuminating pathway. A feasibility study for a planetarium on the site was also intended. The project is expected to cost $54 million over 15–20 years.

In October 2017, the Town announced it would pursue a joint partnership with the RASC-TC and the DDOD to continue to provide educational and public outreach programming, ending the interim programming provided by the YRAA.

== Contemporaries ==
The DDO main instrument was the second-largest telescope in the world when it began operation in 1935. Some of the largest telescopes in 1935 were:

#	Name / Observatory	Image	Aperture	Altitude	First Light	Special advocate
1	Hooker Telescope; Mount Wilson Obs., United States		100 inch 254 cm	1742 m (5715 ft)	1917	George Ellery Hale; Andrew Carnegie
2	David Dunlap Observatory, Canada		74 inch 188 cm	224 m (735 ft)	1935	Clarence Chant
3	Plaskett telescope Dominion Astrophysical Obs., Canada		72 inch 182 cm	230 m (755 ft)	1918	John S. Plaskett
4	69-inch Perkins Telescope; Perkins Observatory, United States		69 inch 175 cm		1931	Hiram Perkins
5	61" reflector Oak Ridge Observatory, United States		61 inch 155 cm		1933	

Later in the 1930s, an 82-inch telescope was completed at McDonald Observatory in Texas. By the end of the next decade Dunlap's was still the fourth largest, due to the opening of the Hale Telescope in 1948. However, the telescope has remained the largest telescope in Canada until 1992, when the somewhat unique UBC-Laval LMT 2.65 m (104 in) came online. However, the LMT is a zenith telescope that only points up, using a liquid metal mirror.

== In popular culture ==
The Observatory is featured multiple times in the NBC television series Hannibal. The administration building resembles the Baltimore State Hospital for the Criminally Insane. The Observatory is also featured on the Netflix production of The Umbrella Academy. Additionally, it is featured in the Showtime show Lost Girl. It has been used multiple times for the Syfy show Warehouse 13.

== See also ==
- Toronto Magnetic and Meteorological Observatory
- University of Toronto Southern Observatory
- York University Observatory
- List of astronomical observatories in Canada
- List of observatories
