= Clarence Chant =

Canadian astronomer and physicist (1865–1956)

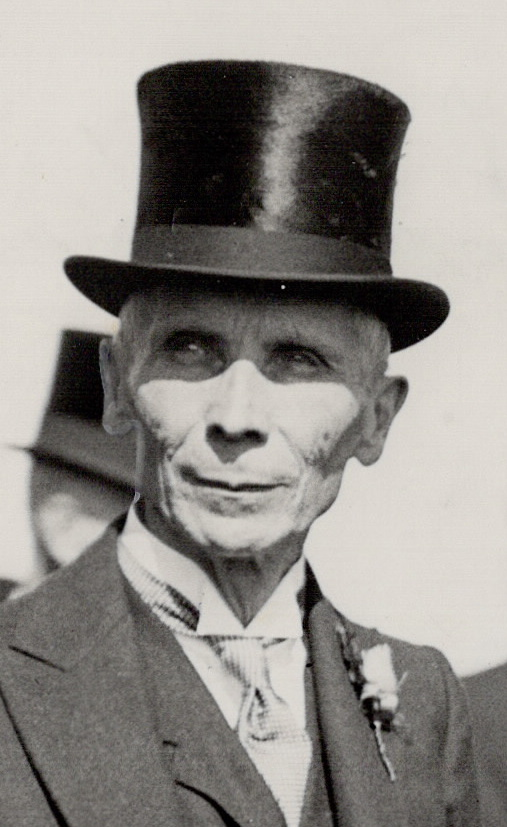
- Chant in 1935 at the opening of the David Dunlap Observatory
- Born: 31 May 1865; Hagerman's Corners, Province of Canada
- Died: 18 November 1956 (aged 91); Richmond Hill, Ontario, Canada
- Education: University of Toronto; Harvard University
- Known for: being the "father of Canadian astronomy"
- Scientific career
- Fields: Astronomy, Physics and Mathematics
- Workplaces: University of Toronto

Notes
- His book, Our Wonderful Universe has been translated into five other languages.

Clarence Augustus Chant (May 31, 1865 – November 18, 1956) was a Canadian astronomer and physicist.

== Early life and education ==
Chant was born in Hagerman's Corners, Canada West to Christopher Chant, a joiner and cabinet maker, and Elizabeth Croft. In 1882 he attended Markham High School, where he demonstrated a mathematical ability. After graduation, he attended St. Catherines Collegiate Institute. Having passed University of Toronto matriculation exams in 1884 but being unable to pay the fees, he attended the York County Model School in Parkdale, Toronto for three months in order to train as a teacher. For the following three years, Chant taught in a one-room schoolhouse in Maxwell, Osprey Township in order to raise his university fees.

By 1887 he began studying mathematics and physics at the University College of the University of Toronto, graduating in 1890.

== Career ==
Upon graduation, Chant became a civil servant in Ottawa, working as a temporary clerk in the office of the Auditor General. The job offered limited prospects; however, in 1891 he was offered a fellowship at University of Toronto, where he gained an appointment as a lecturer of physics the following year.

In 1894 he married Jean Laidlaw, and the couple had two daughters and a son. He earned his master's degree in 1900, and was granted a leave of absence to study for a Doctorate at Harvard University. He returned to Toronto with his PhD and in 1901 he became a professor. During the 1890s and early 1900s, he performed early investigations into X-ray photography and wireless telegraphy in Toronto.

While working at the university he became interested in astronomy, and in 1892 he joined what would become the Royal Astronomical Society of Canada. He served as president of the organization from 1904 until 1907, and also performed editing duties for the society's journal until 1956. He also contributed articles to the journal and the annual Observer's Handbook.

In 1905, he introduced the first astronomy courses at the University of Toronto, and later founded the astronomy program and department. He was the sole astronomer at the university until 1924, and the astronomical program was the only one in Canada. During this period he trained almost every Canadian-trained astronomer active in Canada.

Beginning around 1905, Chant began to lobby the city of Toronto for a large observatory located in Toronto which would serve both the university and allow for public access to astronomy. The project was temporarily shelved with the advent of World War I. In 1913, he researched and wrote a paper for the Royal Astronomical Society of Canada about an unusual event, a meteor procession, that took place that year over Canada and the US. Chant's article, drawn from eyewitness accounts, was the most prominent record of the procession.

During his career, Chant joined five expeditions to observe solar eclipses. This included leading the Canadian contingent on a 1922 expedition that tested Einstein's theory that light could be deflected by a massive body, the General Theory of Relativity. The group included Chant, Jean Chant, Chant's daughter Elizabeth Chant and Reynold K. Young, of the Dominion Astrophysical Observatory.

In the 1920s and 1930s, Chant was a prominent scientist and public figure. He regularly wrote columns for Toronto's newspapers, gave public lectures, and developed a lantern slideshow for public astronomical education. In 1928, he published the book Our Wonderful Universe which was highly popular and was translated into several languages. In Chant's public lectures, he regularly concluded with a pitch promoting a large Toronto observatory suitable for research and public viewing.

In one of these public talks, Chant interested mining magnate David Alexander Dunlap in the proposed observatory, and the two exchanged some preliminary letters regarding the topic. After Dunlap's 1924 death, Chant approached Dunlap's widow, Jessie Donalda Dunlap, with the suggestion that she donate funds for an observatory in her husband's name. Jessie, who was also interested in astronomy, agreed to provide financial backing for the project. In 1935 Chant's goal was achieved with the opening of the David Dunlap Observatory. He retired from the university when the observatory opened, and moved into the Observatory House, Richmond Hill. He died at 91 years of age during the November 1956 lunar eclipse while still residing at the Observatory House.

Chant at the Fourth Conference International Union for Cooperation in Solar Research at Mount Wilson Observatory, 1910

== Awards and honors ==
- Asteroid 3315 Chant is named after him.
- The crater Chant on the Moon is named after him.
