= University of Toronto Southern Observatory =

Former astronomical observatory in Chile

- Organization: University of Toronto
- Location: Las Campanas, Chile
- Coordinates: 29°00′30″S 70°42′00″W
- Altitude: 2,280 m (7,480 ft)
- Weather: 85% clear nights
- Established: 1971
- Closed: June 30, 1997
- Website: astro.utoronto.ca/~utso

Telescopes
- HSHT: 60 cm Cassegrain

The University of Toronto Southern Observatory (UTSO) was an astronomical observatory built by the University of Toronto at the Las Campanas Observatory in Chile. It hosted a single 60 cm Cassegrain telescope and a small cottage for the operators, located amongst the instruments funded by other organizations. The first observational runs started in 1971, and like many smaller instruments, it was later shut down in favor of a partial share in a much larger telescope in 1997. Although small by modern standards, the Southern Observatory nevertheless became famous for its role in the discovery of SN 1987A when U of T astronomer Ian Shelton spotted the supernova while observing with another little-used telescope at the site.

== History ==
The Southern Observatory came about as a side-effect of problems being caused by the urban sprawl in the Toronto area. Originally located far in the country outside the city, the university's David Dunlap Observatory was being encroached on by new suburbs to its west. There seemed to be no end in sight to the outward growth of the city, and the process would eventually result in the Observatory being completely surrounded by housing, rendering it largely unusable due to street lighting. The director considered looking for a new site further north of the city, but at this time in the late 1960s a number of major observatories were starting to set up stations in Chile. Astronomers at the university, Garrison, Racine and van den Bergh, all had experience with Chile, and strongly urged establishing a site there.

The result was a National Research Council of Canada (NRC) grant in 1969 to purchase a 60 cm prototype telescope from Competition Associates in Boston. An agreement was reached with the Carnegie Institution of Washington to locate this telescope at their Las Campanas site in Chile, and further funding for a cottage, Casa Canadiense, was provided by University of Toronto Astronomy endowment funds. Operating costs were originally paid for by a grant from the University of Toronto Associates in New York, and later by grants from the NRC (NSERC after its name changed). The first regular observing run with the telescope started in 1971 under Bill Harris.

The telescope was equipped for spectroscopy, photometry, and photography; CCD's were installed later. In 1992 it was named the Helen Sawyer Hogg Telescope (HSHT) in recognition of Hogg's work on measuring the distance to variable stars in globular clusters. Work continued on the telescope until 1997 when funding was directed to buying a share of the Gemini Observatory being built on Cerro Pachón. HSHT was then donated to the CASLEO (Leoncito Astronomical Complex), the National Observatory of Argentina, and moved, along with the entire dome and building, to their observatory in El Leoncito National Park, where it began operations in 2001. U of T retains a 25% share in observational time on the HSHT.

== See also ==
- Toronto Magnetic and Meteorological Observatory
- David Dunlap Observatory
- List of astronomical observatories
