= Nolan R. Walborn =

American astronomer (1944–2018)

Nolan Revere Walborn
- Born: September 30, 1944; Bloomsburg, Pennsylvania
- Died: February 22, 2018 (aged 73)
- Education: Ph.D.
- Alma mater: University of Chicago
- Parents: George M. Walborn (father); Evelyn Loretta Miller (mother)
- Scientific career
- Fields: Astronomy
- Thesis: Some spectroscopic characteristics of the OB stars (1970)
- Doctoral advisor: William Wilson Morgan

Nolan R. Walborn (September 30, 1944 – February 22, 2018) was an American astronomer. He was a recognized expert on the topic of hot, massive stars, particularly their stellar classification. Walborn served as a researcher at the Space Telescope Science Institute for over 34 years.

== Biography ==
Walborn was born in Bloomsburg, Pennsylvania, one of four children of Rev. George M. Walborn and Evelyn Loretta née Miller. His mother had been a teacher prior to her marriage. In 1953, the family relocated to Argentina when the father accepted a posting from the Lutheran Board of World Missions. His mother saw to the children's elementary education through home schooling with a USA-based correspondence school. At the same time, they attended public school, becoming bilingual as a result. Nolan completed high school at the American Community School in Buenos Aires, graduating as class valedictorian.

Walborn returned to the USA for undergraduate studies in physics at Gettysburg College in Pennsylvania. He played the trumpet with the Gettysburg College Marching Band, and spent two years in the Air Force ROTC program. In between his junior and senior years, he attended his studies at a university institute for space sciences, which led to an interest in astronomy and astrophysics. Walborn graduated summa cum laude in 1966. He joined Yerkes Observatory for graduate studies in astronomy at the University of Chicago. He received his doctorate in 1970 under advisor William Wilson Morgan with a dissertation titled Some spectroscopic characteristics of the OB stars.

His postgraduate work was at the David Dunlap Observatory for the University of Toronto, followed in 1973 by work as a staff astronomer at Cerro Tololo Inter-American Observatory in Chile. While there, his studies included some of the hottest known stars, being of stellar class O3. In 1979 helped draft the proposal to NASA to manage the Space Telescope Science Institute, particularly the science management component. He was a Senior Research Associate at NASA's Goddard Space Flight Center before joining the Space Telescope Science Institute in 1984. There he would remain for the next 34 years, serving in a variety of roles.

During his career, Walborn was listed as an author on 214 peer-reviewed publications. Among his more notable works were studies of the Tarantula Nebula, Eta Carinae, Theta^{1} Orionis C, and the properties of young, massive star clusters. During the 1980s, he collaborated with Barry M. Lasker to identify the progenitor star for SN 1987A. He was the author of chapter 3 of Stellar Spectral Classification, published in 2009 by Princeton University Press. On February 22, 2018, the asteroid 25942 Walborn (2001 EH9) was named in his honor. His family chose to launch some of his ashes into space, a service performed by the Celestis company with the flight name Enterprise.
