= Marjorie J. Vold =

American chemist (1913–1991)

Marjorie J. Vold (October 25, 1913 – November 4, 1991) was an American chemist. Her research focused on colloids, and was recognized with a Garvan-Olin Medal from the American Chemical Society in 1967.

== Early life and education ==
Marjorie Jean Young was born on October 25, 1913, in Ottawa, Ontario, and moved to Mount Hamilton, California as a child, with her parents Reynold K. Young and Wilhelmine E. Aitken. Her grandfather Robert Grant Aitken cataloged binary stars at Lick Observatory, and her father also worked an astronomer there. Young attended the University of California at Berkeley for undergraduate and graduate work, earning her doctorate in 1936. She did postdoctoral work at Stanford University.

== Career ==
Vold moved to southern California in 1941. She worked as a chemist for Union Oil Company during World War II. In 1947 she became a research associate at the University of Southern California, and from 1958 until 1974 she held adjunct professor status there. Her research continued to the end of her life, when she was working from a hospital bed on her final paper on premicelles.

In 1964, Vold and her husband were authors of Colloidal Chemistry, a widely used reference text. Marjorie Vold was awarded the Garvan Medal by the American Chemical Society for 1967, for her pioneering work in computer models of colloids. She was also named one of the Los Angeles Times "Women of the Year" for 1966. Vold received a Guggenheim Fellowship to teach in the Netherlands in 1953–54, the only woman chemist to earn that honor between 1940 and 1970. In 1957, Vold was the first woman to address the Indian Institute of Science in Bangalore, India.

== Personal life ==
Marjorie Young married fellow chemist Robert D. Vold in 1936. They had three children, Mary, Robert and Wylda, all born during World War II.

Marjorie Vold was diagnosed with multiple sclerosis in 1958, and used a wheelchair beginning in the early 1960s. She died from complications of the disease in 1991, age 78.
