= Ian Shelton =

Canadian astronomer

Ian Keith Shelton
- Born: 30 March 1957 (age 69); Winnipeg, Manitoba, Canada
- Education: University of Manitoba
- Occupation: Astronomer
- Known for: Discovering Supernova SN 1987A
- Spouse: Tuba Koktay (married 1996)

Ian Keith Shelton (born 30 March 1957) is a Canadian astronomer who discovered SN 1987A, the first modern supernova close and bright enough to be visible to the naked eye.

Born in Winnipeg, Manitoba, Canada, Shelton received his B.Sc. in 1979 from the University of Manitoba and in 1981 began his professional career working as Resident Astronomer at the University of Toronto Southern Observatory at Las Campanas, Chile.

== Discovery of Supernova 1987A ==
On 1987 February 24, at 02:40, Shelton, while working in Chile at Las Campanas Observatory for the University of Toronto, discovered a previously undetected bright light on a photograph of the Large Magellanic Cloud. Initially skeptical, Shelton went outside to look with the naked eye, and saw that the bright light was indeed present. His discovery turned out to be a supernova, the first visible to the naked eye since Johannes Kepler observed SN 1604 nearly 383 years prior.

Other astronomers around the world also soon noticed the bright new object. As Shelton was among the first to report, he is credited as the discoverer, along with Oscar Duhalde and Albert Jones.

== Subsequent career and life ==
Shelton became a graduate student at the University of Toronto in the fall of 1987. He received his M.Sc. in 1990 and PhD in 1996. He has since worked as an astronomer at several observatories: Japan's 8.3-metre Subaru Telescope in Hawaii, the 1.9-metre David Dunlap Observatory in Toronto, Athabasca University north of Edmonton, and the 6.5-metre MMT Observatory south of Tucson. He has also been a professor in the physics department of Mount Allison University.

He is married to Turkish-born astronomer Tuba Koktay and they reside with their daughter Victoria Büse Shelton in Toronto, Ontario, where he teaches at Toronto Metropolitan University.
