= Reynold Kenneth Young =

Canadian astronomer (1886–1973)

- Born: October 4, 1886; Binbrook, Ontario
- Died: February 27, 1973 (aged 86)
- Resting place: Richmond Hill Presbyterian Cemetery
- Education: Ph.D. in astronomy (1912)
- Alma mater: University of Toronto; University of California, Berkeley
- Known for: Binary stars, astrometric studies
- Spouses: Wilhelmine Ellen Aitken (m. 1912): Amy Gertrude Graham (1936–1973)
- Children: Marjorie Jean Young (b. 1913); John Young (b. 1915)
- Awards: Gold Medal, Royal Astronomical Society of Canada (1909)
- Scientific career
- Institutions: Dominion Observatory; Dominion Astrophysical Observatory; David Dunlap Observatory
- Thesis: Polarization of the Light in the Solar Corona (1912)
- Doctoral advisor: William Wallace Campbell

Reynold Kenneth Young (October 4, 1886 – February 27, 1973) was a Canadian astronomer. He served as first director of the David Dunlap Observatory from 1935 until 1946.

== Biography ==
Young was born on October 4, 1886, in the town of Binbrook, Ontario, the son of Robert Young and Jean Bell. He studied at the Hamilton Collegiate Institute (the city of Hamilton's first high school), then in 1905 he matriculated to the University of Toronto. In 1909 he graduated with a B. A. degree in astronomy, and was awarded a gold medal by the Royal Astronomical Society of Canada for first class honors.

With a fellowship for graduate study at the University of California, Berkeley, Young spent three years as a Fellow at the Lick Observatory. There he met his future wife, Wilhelmina Ellen Aitken, a fellow astronomer and the daughter of the observatory director, Robert G. Aitken. Young collaborated with Wilhelmina on a study of the orbital elements of the comet C/1911 O1 in 1911. In 1912, under his advisor William Wallace Campbell, Young was awarded a doctorate in astronomy from the University of California, Berkeley with a thesis titled, Polarization of the light in the solar corona. On June 17, 1912, Young was married to Wilhelmina. The couple would have two children before their marriage ended shortly after August 1917.

After spending an unhappy year teaching at the University of Kansas physics department, he became a researcher at the Dominion Observatory in 1913. There he published the orbital solutions for nine spectroscopic binaries and performed radial velocity studies of various stars. During 1915, Young developed star charts that used gnomonic projection, which allowed observers to accurately plot the straight line path of a meteor trail.

Following a productive three years, in August 1917 he joined the staff of John S. Plaskett as an astronomer at the recently founded Dominion Astrophysical Observatory (DAO). This was the site of a newly constructed 72-inch (180 cm) aperture telescope, then the second largest in the world. Much of Young's work at the DAO was performing measurements of stellar parallax in collaboration with William E. Harper. Over 1,100 parallax determinations were made. Young used the large instrument to extend the nation's program of stellar spectroscopy to fainter stars of magnitude six or lower.

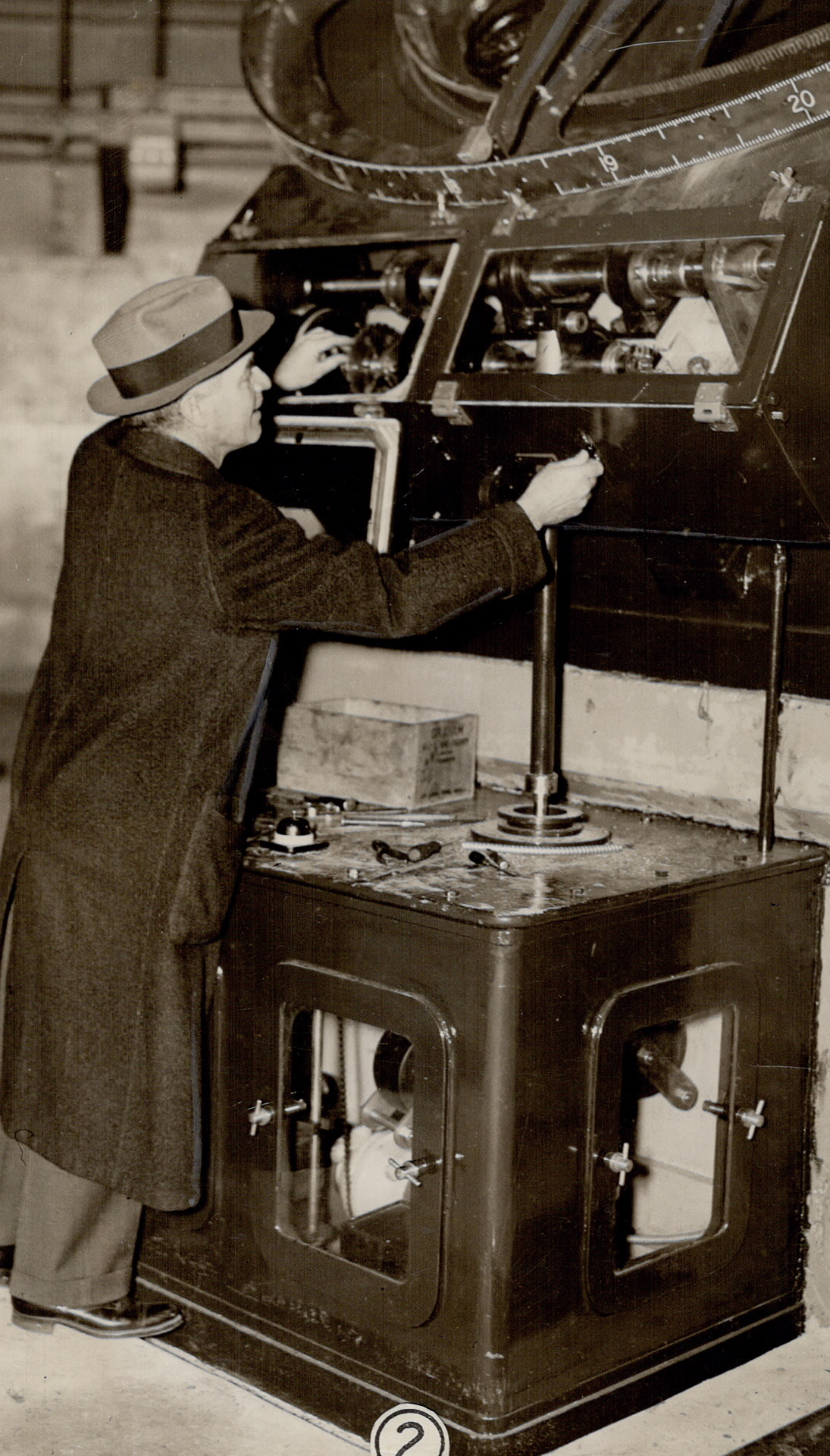
R. K. Young inspects clock of the Dunlap Observatory

Young joined Clarence A. Chant on an expedition to observe the solar eclipse of September 21, 1922 from Wallal, Western Australia. Among their instruments was a camera intended to capture the deflection of starlight by the Sun's gravity. The results were "in harmony" with the predictions of Albert Einstein's theory of general relativity. Young joined Chant at the astronomy department of the University of Toronto in 1924 as an associate professor. During 1926–1928, he designed and constructed the mechanical and optical components for a 19-inch (48 cm) telescope, to be used by the university.

Chant retired immediately following the opening ceremony of the David Dunlap Observatory on May 31, 1935, leaving Young to become the observatory's first director. Young began a four-year study of stellar radial velocities, while simultaneously assembling a photographic archive. He served as chair of the University of Toronto astronomy department from 1935 to 1946. In 1936, he was married to Amy Gertrude Graham, a mother of four children from a prior marriage. Starting in 1940, much of the observatory staff left to serve in Canada's military effort during World War 2. However, due to Young's efforts, the observatory remained in operation throughout the war. Following the conflict, Young retired as Professor Emeritus on January 1, 1946.

Until 1964, Young lived in Richmond Hill with his wife, then the couple moved to Cobourg. His wife died on February 27, 1973. The following year, Young moved to Peterborough to be near his step-children. He died December 24, 1977. His daughter Marjorie J. Vold née Young became an expert in colloid chemistry. She was named the Los Angeles Times woman of the year in 1966, and was awarded the Garvan-Olin Medal from the American Chemical Society in 1967.
