= Tom Bolton (astronomer) =

American-Canadian astronomer (1943–2021)

- Born: Charles Thomas Bolton; April 15, 1943; Tullahoma, Tennessee, U.S.
- Died: c. February 4, 2021 (aged 77); Richmond Hill, Ontario, Canada
- Education: University of Illinois; University of Michigan
- Known for: Evidence for Stellar-mass black holes
- Awards: Fellow of the Royal Society of Canada
- Scientific career
- Fields: Astronomy
- Workplaces: David Dunlap Observatory, University of Toronto

Charles Thomas Bolton (April 15, 1943 – c. February 4, 2021) was an American-Canadian astronomer at the University of Toronto who was one of the first in his field to present strong evidence of the existence of a stellar-mass black hole.

== Biography ==
Bolton was born in Camp Forrest, a military base in Tullahoma, Tennessee. He received his bachelor's degree in 1966 from the University of Illinois, followed by a 1968 master's degree and a 1970 doctoral degrees from the University of Michigan.

Bolton then worked as a postdoctoral researcher at the David Dunlap Observatory in Richmond Hill, Ontario, teaching there until 1972. He taught at Scarborough College from 1971 to 1972, and at Erindale College from 1972 to 1973. Thereafter, he was affiliated with the University of Toronto astronomy department, eventually becoming an emeritus professor.

In 1970, Bolton developed the first computer models for stellar spectra that were precise enough to compare with data from real stars.

In 1971, as a post-doctoral fellow and part-time faculty member studying binary systems at the Dunlap Observatory, Bolton observed star HDE 226868 wobble as if it were orbiting around an invisible but massive companion emitting powerful X-rays, independently of the work by Louise Webster and Paul Murdin, at the Royal Greenwich Observatory. Further analysis gave an estimate about the amount of mass needed for the gravitational pull, which proved to be too much for a neutron star. After more observations confirmed the results, by 1973, the astronomical community generally recognized black hole Cygnus X-1, lying in the plane of the Milky Way galaxy at a galactic latitude of about 3 degrees.

In 1985, Bolton and Douglas Gies showed that hot, massive "runaway OB stars" (stars that travel at an abnormally high velocity relative to the surrounding interstellar medium), could be accelerated through stellar interactions within star clusters, in addition to being ejected from binary systems after supernova explosions.

Bolton was instrumental in passing the first light-pollution regulation Canada, a 1995 bylaw to limit light pollution in the town Richmond Hill, home of the David Dunlap Observatory. He was a fellow of the Royal Society of Canada. Bolton died in February 2021, at his home in Richmond Hill.
