= Hagerman's Corners, Ontario =

Hagerman's Corners
- Dispersed rural community
- Location in southern Ontario
- Coordinates: 43°50′57″N 79°18′19″W
- Country: Canada
- Province: Ontario
- Regional municipality: York
- City: Markham
- Established: 1803
- Elevation: 203 m (666 ft)
- Time zone: UTC-5 (EST)
  - Summer (DST): UTC-4 (EDT)
- Area codes: 905, 289 and 365
- NTS Map: 030M14
- GNBC Code: FEQTA

Hagerman's Corners is a dispersed rural community in Markham, Ontario, Canada. It is geographically located between the communities of Milliken Mills and Unionville.

Hagerman's Corners was founded in 1803 by Nicholas Hagerman, who owned the property at the northwest corner of the intersection. By 1878 the village had a hotel (Bee Hive Hotel) and tavern, a general store and post office (1873), and a wagon maker. In 1849, a Wesleyan Methodist church was built on a private Hagerman family burying ground; the wood-frame church was replaced by a brick building in 1874. While the church was torn down in the 1920s, the cemetery on the east side of Kennedy Road (on James Fairless' farm), north of 14th Avenue remains with former Presbyterian church demolished. Hagerman Mennonite Church has met in the village since 1932.

== Transportation ==
- Highway 407 traverses along the northern edge of the community.
- 14th Avenue, the main east–west thoroughfare
- Kennedy Road, traverses the eastern edge of the community.
- Warden Avenue, traverses the western edge of the community.
- Birchmount Road, the main north–south thoroughfare.
