= Leoncito Astronomical Complex =

El Leoncito Astronomical Complex
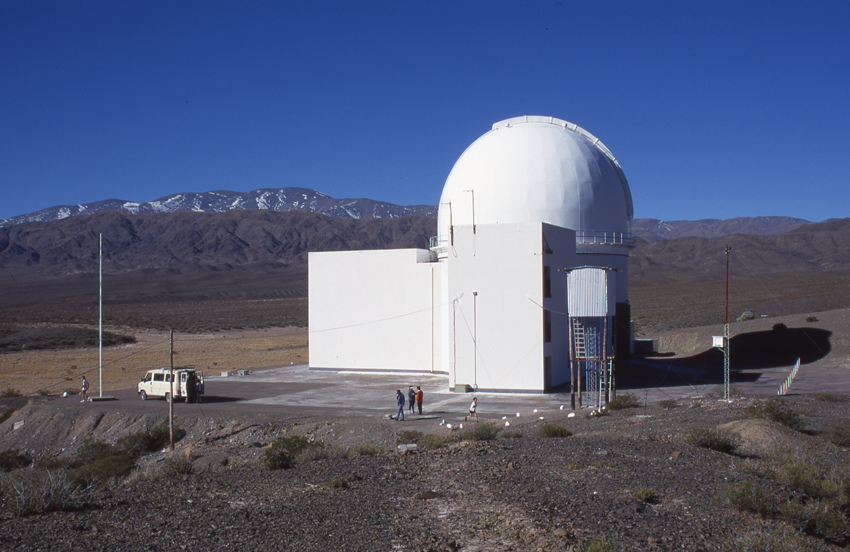
- Dome of the Jorge Sahade Telescope at CASLEO
- Alternative names: CASLEO
- Organization: National Scientific and Technical Research Council
- Observatory code: 829
- Location: San Juan Province, Argentina
- Coordinates: 31.7986°S 69.2956°W
- Altitude: 2,483 metres (8,146 ft)
- Established: 1983
- Website: El Leoncito Astronomical Complex

Telescopes
- Jorge Sahade Telescope: 2.2 m reflector
- Solar Submillimeter Telescope: 1.5 m radio telescope
- Helen Sawyer Hogg Telescope: 0.6 m reflector
- Astrograph for the Southern Hemisphere: 0.5 m reflector
- Horacio Ghielmetti Telescope: 0.4 m reflector
- Related media on Commons

The El Leoncito Astronomical Complex (Spanish: Complejo Astronómico El Leoncito - CASLEO) is an astronomical observatory in the San Juan Province of Argentina. CASLEO is one of two observatories located within El Leoncito National Park, which is in a part of the country which rarely sees cloud cover. The other facility in the park is the Carlos U. Cesco Astronomical Station of the Félix Aguilar Observatory. CASLEO was established in 1983 by an agreement between National Scientific and Technical Research Council (CONICET) of Argentina, the Ministry of Science, Technology and Innovation (MINCYT) of Argentina, the National University of San Juan (UNSJ), the National University of La Plata (UNLP), and the National University of Córdoba (UNC). The facility was dedicated in 1986 and regular observations began in 1987.

CASLEO's telescopes are located in two separate areas within the El Leoncito Park. The Jorge Sahade and Submillimeter telescopes are at the main site on the edge of the Pampa de la Ciénaga del Medio, along with support facilities. The Helen Sawyer Hogg telescope, Ghielimetti telescope, and the Astrograph for the Southern Hemisphere are located on Cerro Burek, approximately 1.6 km (1 mi) to the northeast and 85 m (279 ft) higher. Separating the areas is the Arroyo El Leoncito, which flows west into the Barreal Blanco in the Pampa de El Leoncito. The driving distance between the two sites is approximately 7 km (4.3 mi).

== Telescopes ==
- The 2.15 m (85 in) Jorge Sahade Telescope (JS) is a Ritchey-Chrètien reflecting telescope built by Boller & Chivens. The 40-ton telescope is supported by an equatorial mount. It was installed in 1984 and began regular operations in 1987. It was originally purchased by UNLP in the 1960s.
- The 1.5 m (59 in) Solar Submillimeter Telescope (SST) is a solar radio telescope design to observe solar flares at two wavelengths in the submillimeter range. It is a partnership of CASLEO and the Mackenzie Center for Radio Astronomy and Astrophysics of Brazil. Several other organizations have also participated. The SST was installed in 1999 and began routine operations in 2001.
- The 0.61 m (24 in) Helen Sawyer Hogg Telescope (HSHT) is a classical Cassegrain reflector built by Competition Associates and installed in 1971 at the University of Toronto Southern Observatory, which was located at Las Campanas Observatory in Chile. In 1997 UTSO was shut down, and the telescope was loaned indefinitely to CASLEO, where it was installed in 1998. The telescope was dedicated to Helen Sawyer Hogg before it was moved.
- The 0.45 m (18 in) Astrograph for the Southern Hemisphere (ASH) is a reflecting telescope on an equatorial mount. It is a partnership of CASLEO and the Astrophysics Institute of Andalucía.
- The 0.41 m (16 in) Horacio Ghielmetti Telescope (THG) is a Schmidt-Cassegrain reflector made by Meade Instruments attached to an equatorial mount. It is operated by CASLEO and the Institute of Astronomy and Space Physics of Argentina.
- The HASTA (H-alpha Solar Telescope of Argentina) for full-disk monitoring of solar H-alpha activity at high resolution.

== Gallery ==
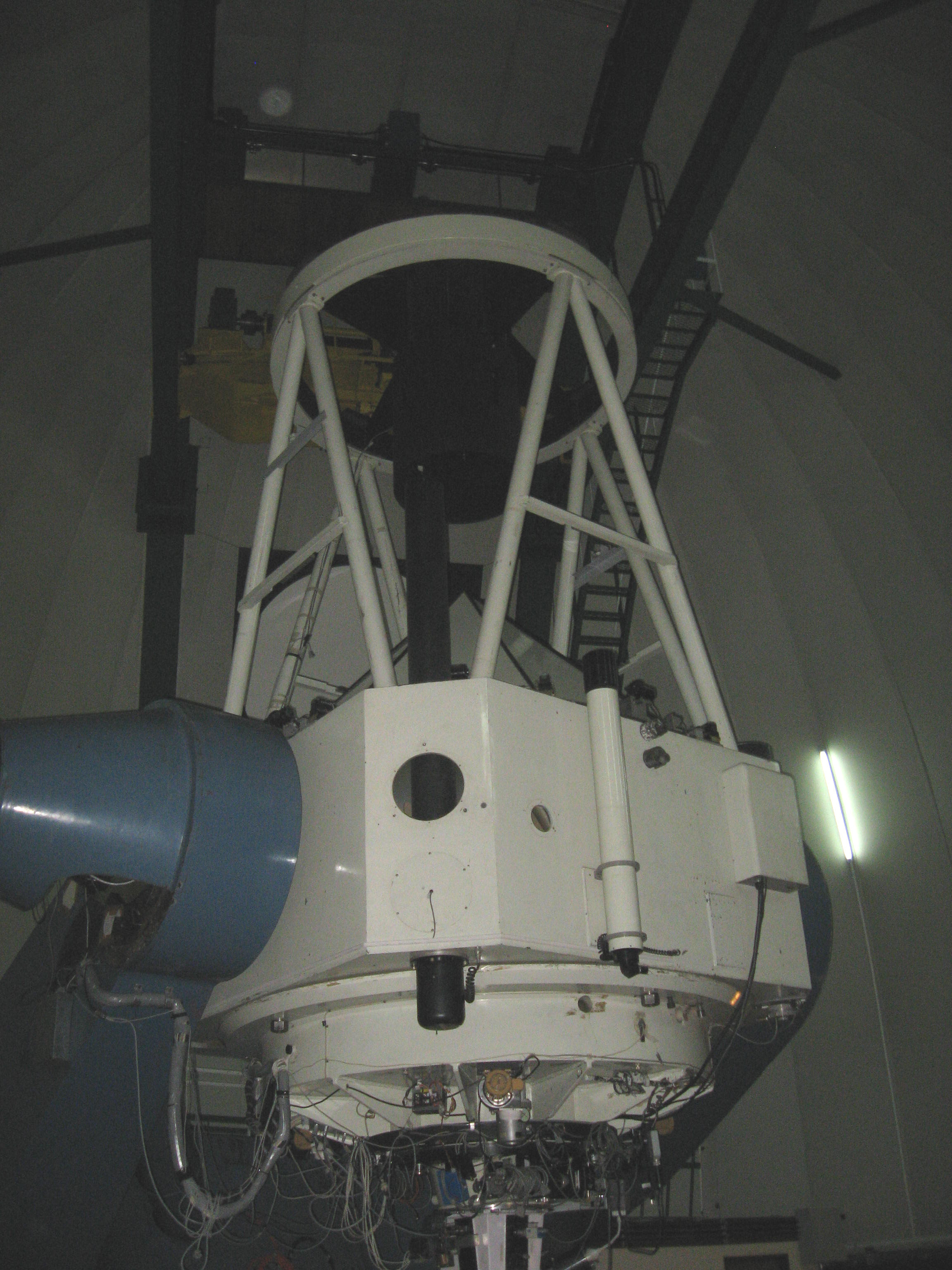
Jorge Sahade Telescope

== See also ==
- University of Toronto Southern Observatory
- List of astronomical observatories
