= Betty Louise Turtle =

Australian astronomer and physicist

Betty Louise Turtle (née Webster [also Webster in published works]) (20 May 1941 – 29 September 1990) was an Australian astronomer and physicist. In 1971, with her colleague Paul Murdin, she identified the powerful X-ray source Cygnus X-1 as the first clear candidate for a black hole.

== Career ==
Turtle attended the University of Adelaide and continued studies as one of the first students at the graduate school of Mount Stromlo Observatory, outside Canberra where she was strongly influenced by the American astronomers Bart Bok and Priscilla Fairfield Bok. She gained a Ph.D. in 1967 on the subject of southern planetary nebulae while working with the Swedish astronomer Bengt Westerlund. She moved to the University of Wisconsin before taking up a position at the Royal Greenwich Observatory at Herstmonceux Castle, firstly as a Scientific Officer then Principal Scientific Officer. She worked with Richard Woolley, the Astronomer Royal, and then Paul Murdin, with whom she had been elected to the Royal Astronomical Society at the same time in 1963.

Turtle and Murdin were careful about the language of the paper they submitted to the journal Nature describing their discovery, titled Cygnus X-1 — a Spectroscopic Binary with a Heavy Companion? with the final words, "...it might be a black hole." Their boss, Woolley, was more conservative as an astronomer and their cautiousness was mirrored by colleagues, though other astronomers (notably Charles Thomas Bolton) agreed with them.

Her work in Sussex led directly to a posting at the South African Astronomical Observatory, where Woolley became director from 1972, and then the new 3.9-metre Anglo-Australian Telescope in a commissioning role before becoming staff astronomer there.

In 1978, she found her final employment at the University of New South Wales in the physics faculty; in November that year she married Tony Turtle. While at the university, she was the driving force for the Automated Patrol Telescope at the Siding Spring Observatory, introduced a fourth-year course for astronomers, served on or chaired many committees and promoted astronomy very actively through the International Astronomical Union and the Astronomical Society of Australia.

She died after a long illness at her home in Paddington, Sydney.

== Legacy ==
The Bok Prize, awarded annually to undergraduates for excellence in research, was introduced largely at Turtle's instigation, and is sponsored by Astronomical Society of Australia and the Australian Academy of Science. In honour of her contribution to astronomy, the Louise Webster Prize has been awarded annually since 2009 by the Astronomical Society of Australia to reward outstanding postdoctoral research early in a scientist's career.

== In popular culture ==
In October 2024, the ABC Science Show carried an interview by Robyn Williams with author Marcus Chown discussing Louise Webster's contribution to the discovery of black holes. Her and Paul Murdin's paper theorizing that the x-ray source Cygnus X-1 may be a black hole was discussed in the NOVA episode Black Hole Apocalypse.
