= Paul Murdin =

British astronomer

Paul Murdin OBE FRAS
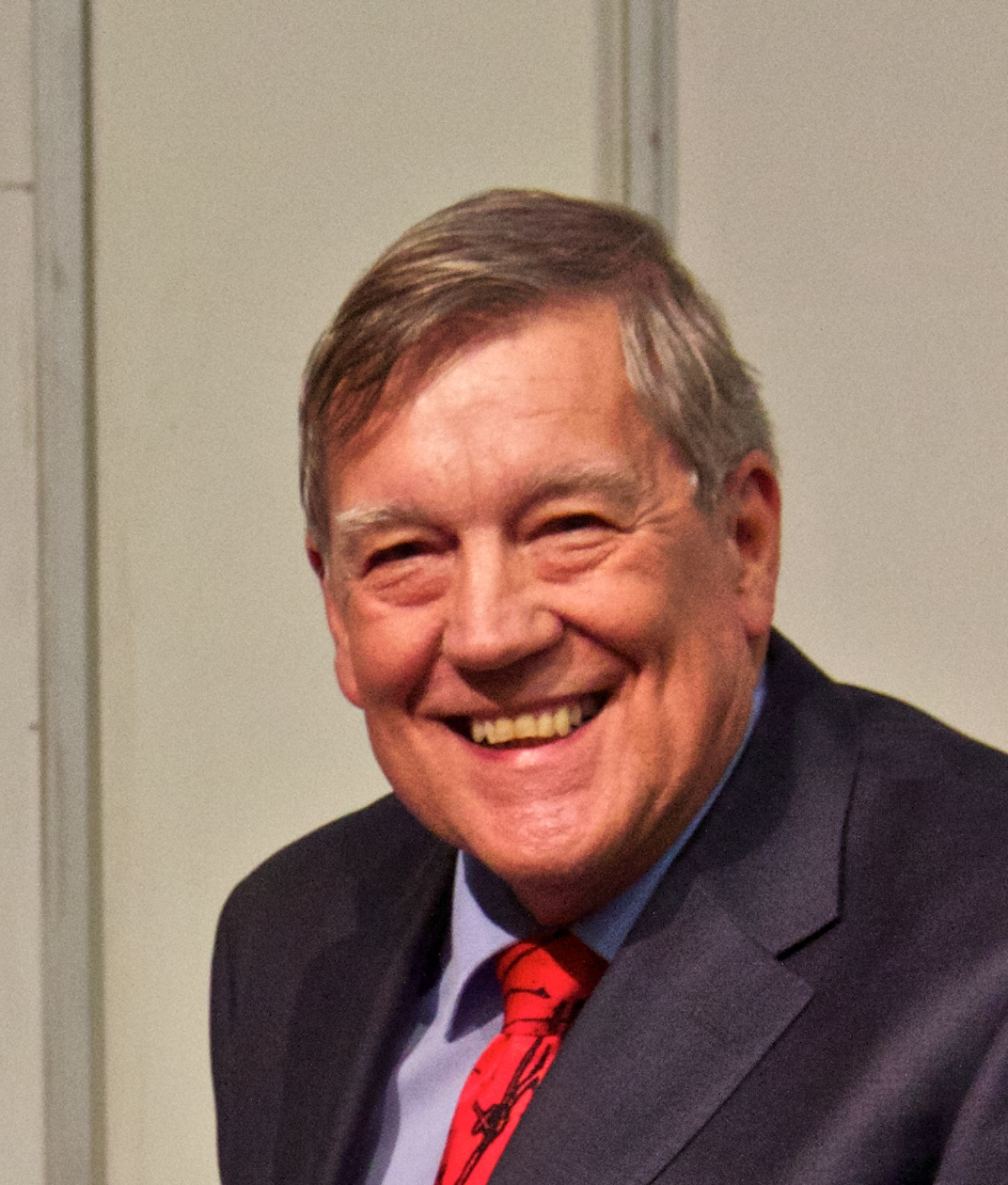
- Murdin in 2012

2nd President of the European Astronomical Society
- In office 21 August 1993 – 5 July 1997
- Preceded by: Lodewijk Woltjer
- Succeeded by: Jean-Paul Zahn

Personal details
- Born: 5 January 1942 (age 84)
- Citizenship: British
- Spouse: Lesley Murdin
- Children: 3
- Scientific career
- Education: University of Oxford (MA); University of Rochester (PhD)

Paul Geoffrey Murdin OBE FRAS (born 5 January 1942) is a British astronomer. He identified the first clear candidate for a black hole, Cygnus X-1, with his colleague Louise Webster.

He studied Mathematics and Physics at the universities of Oxford and Rochester. In 1962, he took an eight-week summer residential course supporting researchers at the Royal Greenwich Observatory in Herstmonceux and at the end was offered a post by the Astronomer Royal, Richard Woolley. He left to study a PhD at Rochester and returned to the RGO in 1970 as a research fellow. During his three-year contract there, he wondered what he could contribute to find out about the provenance of powerful cosmic x-ray sources that had recently been detected, particularly Cygnus X-1.

After he had made unsuccessful searches for light variations and unusual spectra among the hundreds of stars within the area of positional uncertainty of the X-ray source, a radio star was found that was coincident with a star HDE226868. He decided, with the Australian Louise Webster, to investigate whether the star was a binary star, possibly with one of the pair being the X-ray source as well as a radio source, but not being visible. They measured the Doppler shift to find that HDE226868 was a binary star with an orbit of 5.6 days orbiting an invisible partner, presumably the source of the X-rays, and which they calculated to be certainly more than 2.5 and probably more than six solar masses. Such a star cannot be a white dwarf or neutron star and they assumed this body to be a black hole.

With Louise Webster, he submitted a paper with "modest" language to Nature, only mentioning the term “black hole” in the final sentence. Woolley was quite conservative in his views on astronomy, regarding black holes as "fanciful" (also famously dismissing worthwhile space exploration as "utter bilge"). Astronomer Charles Thomas Bolton then published a paper with a similar conclusion and more astronomers followed suit. The discovery helped Murdin to secure his future employment.

He and Webster were amongst the first staff astronomers at the Anglo-Australian Telescope and he continued in his vein of discovery using similar techniques. He returned to the Royal Greenwich Observatory and worked on developing the UK-Netherlands observatory at La Palma, which became the Isaac Newton Group of Telescopes. He was its first head of operations until 1987. He was the director of the Royal Observatory, Edinburgh from 1991–93. Then he joined the Particle Physics and Astronomy Research Council, planning and developing the UK's space research policy. He was President of the European Astronomical Society and Treasurer of the Royal Astronomical Society (to which he'd first been elected as a Junior Member at the age of 17 in 1959, moving to Fellow in April 1963), during which time membership increased, its public outreach programme was established and its journal became the most prominent worldwide. He presided over or chaired various committees of the International Astronomical Union (IAU).

He has authored and edited academic and popular books on astronomy and has written for many journals and newspapers, and well as having appeared regularly on television and radio programmes. In 2023 he was a guest on the BBC Radio 4 programme The Life Scientific. Now retired and living in Cambridge, he is a visiting professor at Liverpool John Moores University, Senior Fellow Emeritus at the Institute of Astronomy, Cambridge and Senior Member at Wolfson College.

== Awards and legacy ==
- 1988: Officer of the Order of the British Empire.
- 2011: Award of the Royal Astronomical Society for Services to Astronomy.
- 2012: Eric Zucker award of the Federation of Astronomical Societies for outreach to amateur astronomers.
- 2012: Asteroid 128562, discovered in 2004 by astronomers in Arizona, was named 'Murdin' by the IAU.

== Books ==
- Secrets of the Universe, Paul Murdin, Published by Thames and Hudson Ltd 2020-02-20, London (2020) ISBN 9780500295199
- Universe: Exploring the Astronomical World, Kirsty Schaper, Paul Murdin and David Malin, Published by Phaidon Inc Ltd (2019), ISBN 9781838660154
- The Secret Lives of Planets: A User's Guide to the Solar System, Paul Murdin, Published by Hodder & Stoughton (2019) ISBN 9781529319415
- Rock Legends, Paul Murdin, Published by Springer (2016), ISBN 9783319318356
- The History of Astronomy: discovering the universe, Paul Murdin, Published by Sevenoaks (2015) ISBN 9781781773529
- Planetary Vistas : The Landscapes of Other Worlds, Paul Murdin, Published by Springer 2015-06 (2015) ISBN 9783319152417
- Are We Being Watched?: The Search for Life in the Cosmos, Paul Murdin, Published by Thames and Hudson Ltd (2013) ISBN 9780500516713
- Mapping the Universe : the Interactive History of Astronomy, Paul Murdin, Published by London: Sevenoaks Publishing (2011)
- Full Meridian of Glory: Perilous Adventures in the Competition to Measure the Earth, Paul Murdin, Published by Springer, New York (2009), ISBN 9780387755335
- Secrets of the Universe: How We Discovered the Cosmos, Paul Murdin, Published by University Of Chicago Press (2009), ISBN 9780226551432
- The Firefly Encyclopedia of Astronomy, Margaret Penston; Editor-Paul Murdin, Published by Firefly Books (2004) ISBN 9781552977972
- Encyclopedia of astronomy and astrophysics, editor-in-chief Paul Murdin, Published by IoP Publishing Bristol (2001), ISBN 0333750888
- End in Fire: The Supernova in the Large Magellanic Cloud, Paul, Murdin, Published by Cambridge University Press (1990) ISBN 9780521374958
- Colours of the Galaxies, David Malin & Paul Murdin Published by PROMOTIONAL REPRINT COMPANY (1984) ISBN 9781856481267
- Supernovae, Paul Murdin and Lesley Murdin, Published by Cambridge University Press, Cambridge, UK (1985) ISBN 9780521300384
- Colours of the Stars, Paul Murdin, (1984) ISBN 9780521257145
- Catalogue of the Universe, Paul Murdin & David Allen, Published by Cambridge University (1979) ISBN 9780521228596
- The New Astronomy: Black holes, white dwarfs, pulsars quasars, and supernovae, how the new astronomy is changing our concepts of the universe, Paul and Lesley Murdin, Published by Reference International (1978)
- The Astronomer's Telescope, Patrick Moore and Paul Murdin, Published by Brockhampton Press, Leicester (1962)
