= SN 1987A =

1987 supernova event in the constellation Dorado

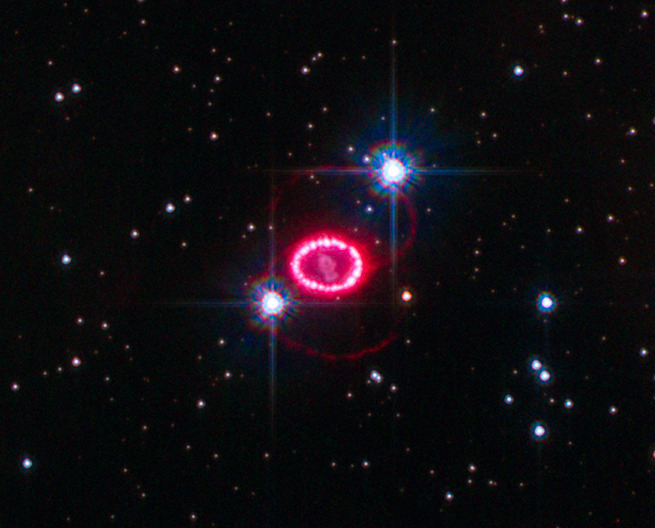
- Hubble Space Telescope image of supernova remnant SN 1987A
- Event type: Supernova
- Type II (peculiar)
- Date: February 24, 1987; 39 years ago
- Constellation: Dorado
- Right ascension: 05^{h} 35^{m} 28.03^{s}
- Declination: −69° 16′ 11.79″
- Epoch: J2000
- Galactic coordinates: G279.7-31.9
- Distance: 51.4 kpc (168,000 ly)
- Host: Large Magellanic Cloud
- Progenitor: Sanduleak -69 202
- Progenitor type: B3 blue supergiant
- Colour (B-V): +0.085
- Notable features: Closest recorded supernova since invention of telescope
- Peak apparent magnitude: +2.9
- Other designations: SN 1987A, AAVSO 0534-69, INTREF 262, SNR 1987A, SNR B0535-69.3, [BMD2010] SNR J0535.5-6916
- Related media on Commons

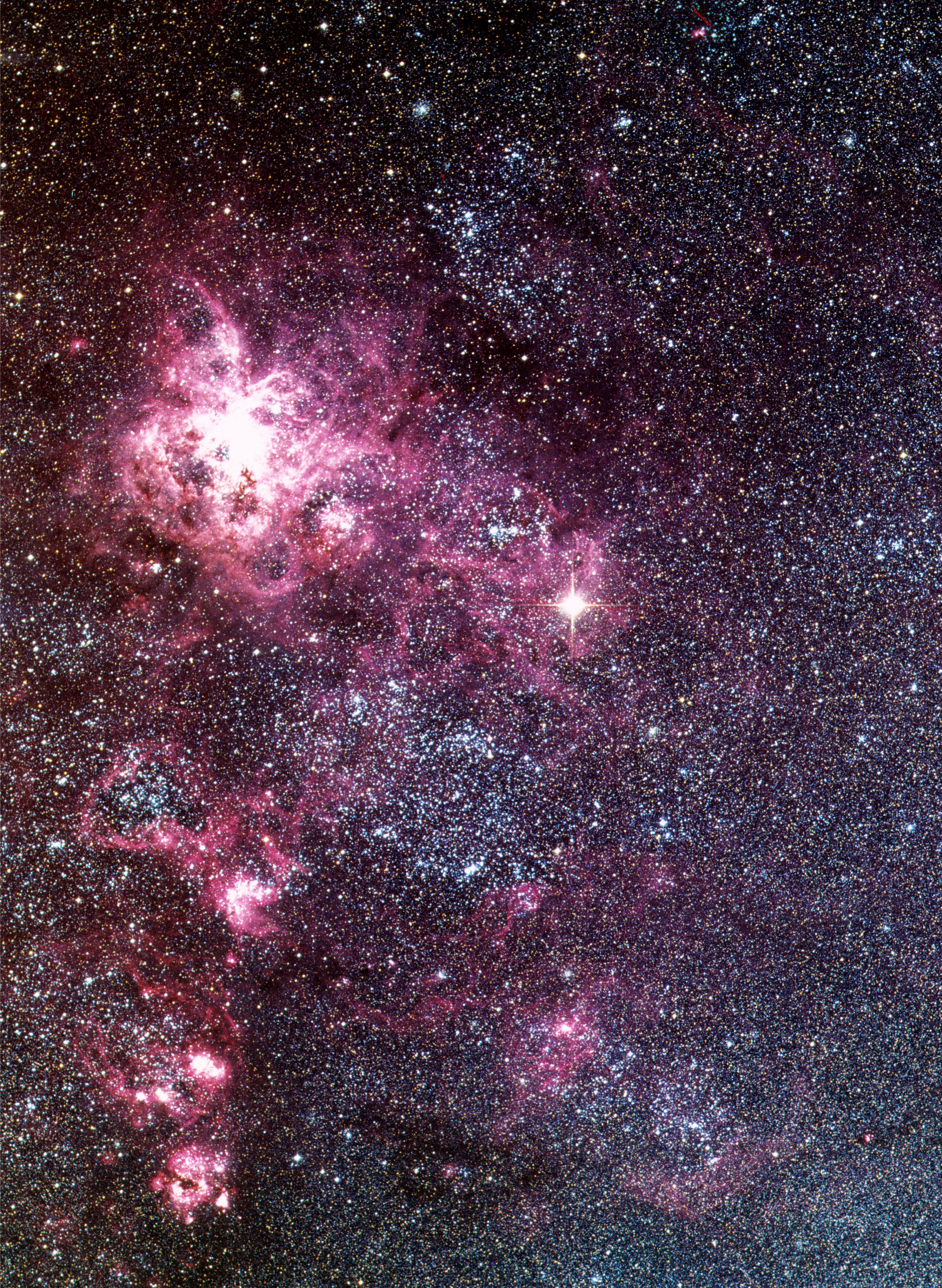
Supernova 1987A is the bright light source at the centre of the image, near the Tarantula Nebula

SN 1987A was a Type II supernova in the Large Magellanic Cloud, a dwarf satellite galaxy of the Milky Way. It occurred approximately 51.4 kiloparsecs (168,000 light-years) (Note: approximately 15.03 sextillion meters from Earth) from Earth and was the closest observed supernova since Kepler's Supernova in 1604. Light and neutrinos from the explosion reached Earth on February 23, 1987, and it was designated "SN 1987A" as the first supernova discovered that year. Its brightness peaked in May of that year, with an apparent magnitude of about 3, brighter than the constellation's brightest star, Alpha Doradus.

It was the first supernova that modern astronomers were able to study in great detail, and its observations have provided much insight into core-collapse supernovae. SN 1987A provided the first opportunity to confirm by direct observation the radioactive source of the energy for visible light emissions, by detecting predicted gamma-ray line radiation from two of its abundant radioactive nuclei. This proved the radioactive nature of the long-duration post-explosion glow of supernovae.

In 2019, indirect evidence for the presence of a collapsed neutron star within the remnants of SN 1987A was discovered using the Atacama Large Millimeter Array telescope. Further evidence was subsequently uncovered in 2021 through observations conducted by the Chandra and NuSTAR X-ray telescopes.

== Discovery ==
SN 1987A was discovered independently by Ian Shelton and Oscar Duhalde at the Las Campanas Observatory in Chile on February 24, 1987, and within the same 24 hours by Albert Jones in New Zealand.

Later investigations found photographs showing the supernova brightening rapidly early on February 23. On March 4–12, 1987, it was observed from space by Astron, the largest ultraviolet space telescope of that time.

== Progenitor ==
Four days after the event was recorded, the progenitor star was tentatively identified as Sanduleak −69 202 (Sk −69 202), a blue supergiant. After the supernova faded, that identification was definitively confirmed, as Sk −69 202 had disappeared. The possibility of a blue supergiant producing a supernova was considered surprising, and the confirmation led to further research which identified an earlier supernova with a blue supergiant progenitor.

Some models of SN 1987A's progenitor attributed the blue color largely to its chemical composition rather than its evolutionary stage, particularly the low levels of heavy elements. There was some speculation that the star might have merged with a companion star before the supernova. However, it is now widely understood that blue supergiants are natural progenitors of some supernovae, although there is still speculation that the evolution of such stars could require mass loss involving a binary companion.

== Neutrino emissions ==
Approximately two to three hours before the visible light from SN 1987A reached Earth, a burst of neutrinos was observed at three neutrino observatories. This was likely due to neutrino emission which occurs simultaneously with core collapse, but before visible light is emitted as the shock wave reaches the stellar surface. At 7:35 UT, 12 antineutrinos were detected by Kamiokande II, 8 by IMB, and 5 by Baksan in a burst lasting less than 13 seconds. Approximately three hours earlier, the Mont Blanc liquid scintillator detected a five-neutrino burst, but this is generally believed to not be associated with SN 1987A.

The Kamiokande II detection, which at 12 neutrinos had the largest sample population, showed the neutrinos arriving in two distinct pulses. The first pulse at 07:35:35 comprised 9 neutrinos over a period of 1.915 seconds. A second pulse of three neutrinos arrived during a 3.220-second interval from 9.219 to 12.439 seconds after the beginning of the first pulse.

Although only 25 neutrinos were detected during the event, it was a significant increase from the previously observed background level. This was the first time neutrinos known to be emitted from a supernova had been observed directly, which marked the beginning of neutrino astronomy. The observations were consistent with theoretical supernova models in which 99% of the energy of the collapse is radiated away in the form of neutrinos. The observations are also consistent with the models' estimates of a total neutrino count of 10^{58} with a total energy of 10^{46} joules, i.e. a mean value of some dozens of MeV per neutrino. Billions of neutrinos passed through a square centimeter on Earth.

The neutrino measurements allowed upper bounds on neutrino mass and charge, as well as the number of flavors of neutrinos and other properties. For example, the data show that the rest mass of the electron neutrino is < 16 eV/c^{2} at 95% confidence, which is 30,000 times smaller than the mass of an electron. The data suggest that the total number of neutrino flavors is at most 8 but other observations and experiments give tighter estimates. Many of these results have since been confirmed or tightened by other neutrino experiments such as more careful analysis of solar neutrinos and atmospheric neutrinos as well as experiments with artificial neutrino sources.

== Neutron star ==
SN 1987A appears to be a core-collapse supernova, which should result in a neutron star given the size of the original star. The neutrino data indicate that a compact object did form at the star's core, and astronomers immediately began searching for the collapsed core. The Hubble Space Telescope took images of the supernova regularly from August 1990 without a clear detection of a neutron star.

A number of possibilities for the "missing" neutron star were considered. First, that the neutron star may be obscured by surrounding dense dust clouds. Second, that a pulsar was formed, but with either an unusually large or small magnetic field. Third, that large amounts of material fell back on the neutron star, collapsing it further into a black hole. Neutron stars and black holes often give off light as material falls onto them. If there is a compact object in the supernova remnant, but no material to fall onto it, it would be too dim for detection. A fourth hypothesis is that the collapsed core became a quark star.

In 2019, evidence was presented for a neutron star inside one of the brightest dust clumps, close to the expected position of the supernova remnant. In 2021, further evidence was presented of hard X-ray emissions from SN 1987A originating in the pulsar wind nebula. The latter result is supported by a three-dimensional magnetohydrodynamic model, which describes the evolution of SN 1987A from the SN event to the present, and reconstructs the ambient environment, predicting the absorbing power of the dense stellar material around the pulsar.

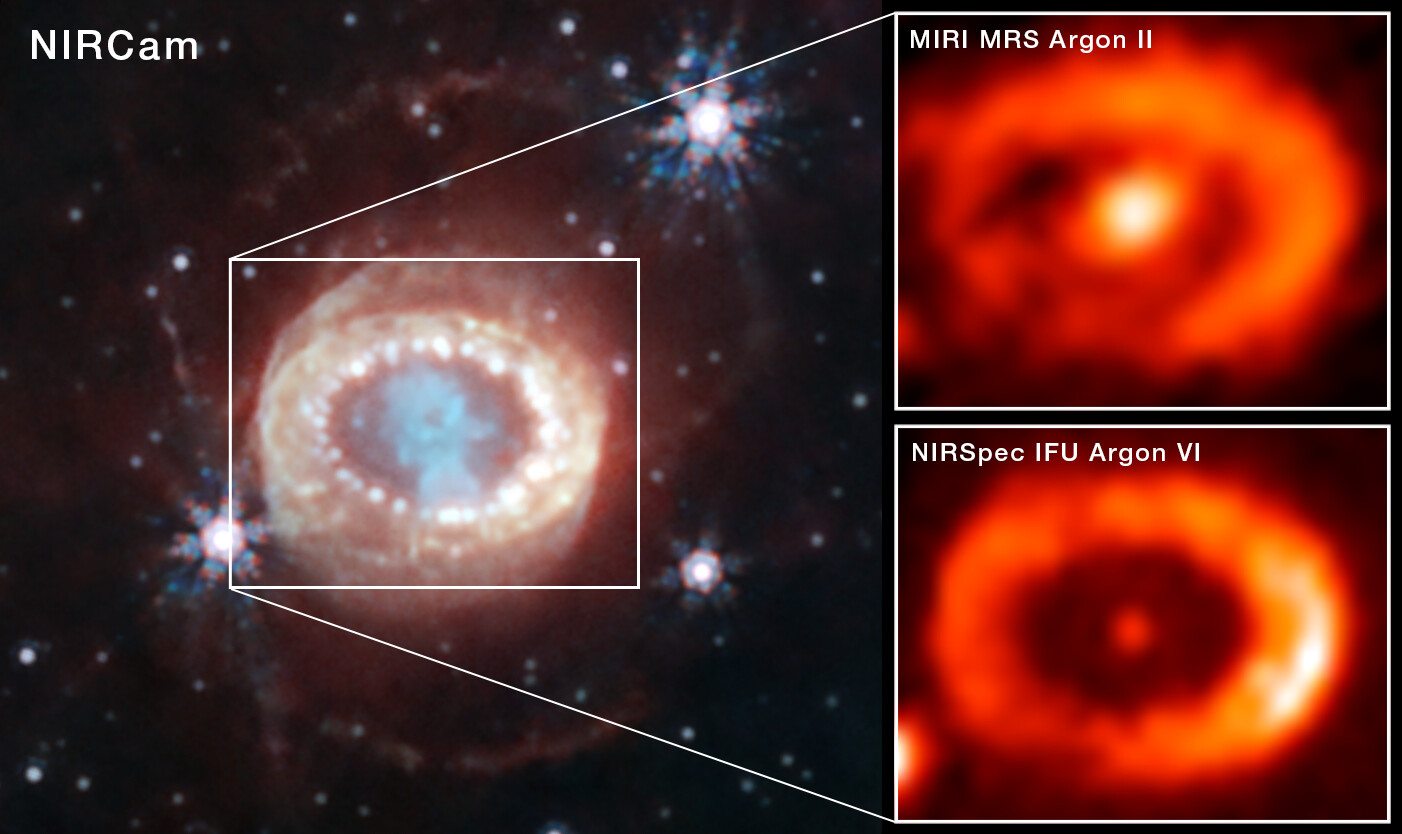
James Webb Space Telescope imagery of the supernova remnants, revealing emitted argon

In 2024, researchers using the James Webb Space Telescope (JWST) identified distinctive emission lines of ionized argon within the central region of the Supernova 1987A remnants. These emission lines, discernible only near the remnant's core, were analyzed using photoionization models. The models indicate that the observed line ratios and velocities can be attributed to ionizing radiation originating from a neutron star illuminating gas from the inner regions of the exploded star.

== Light curve ==
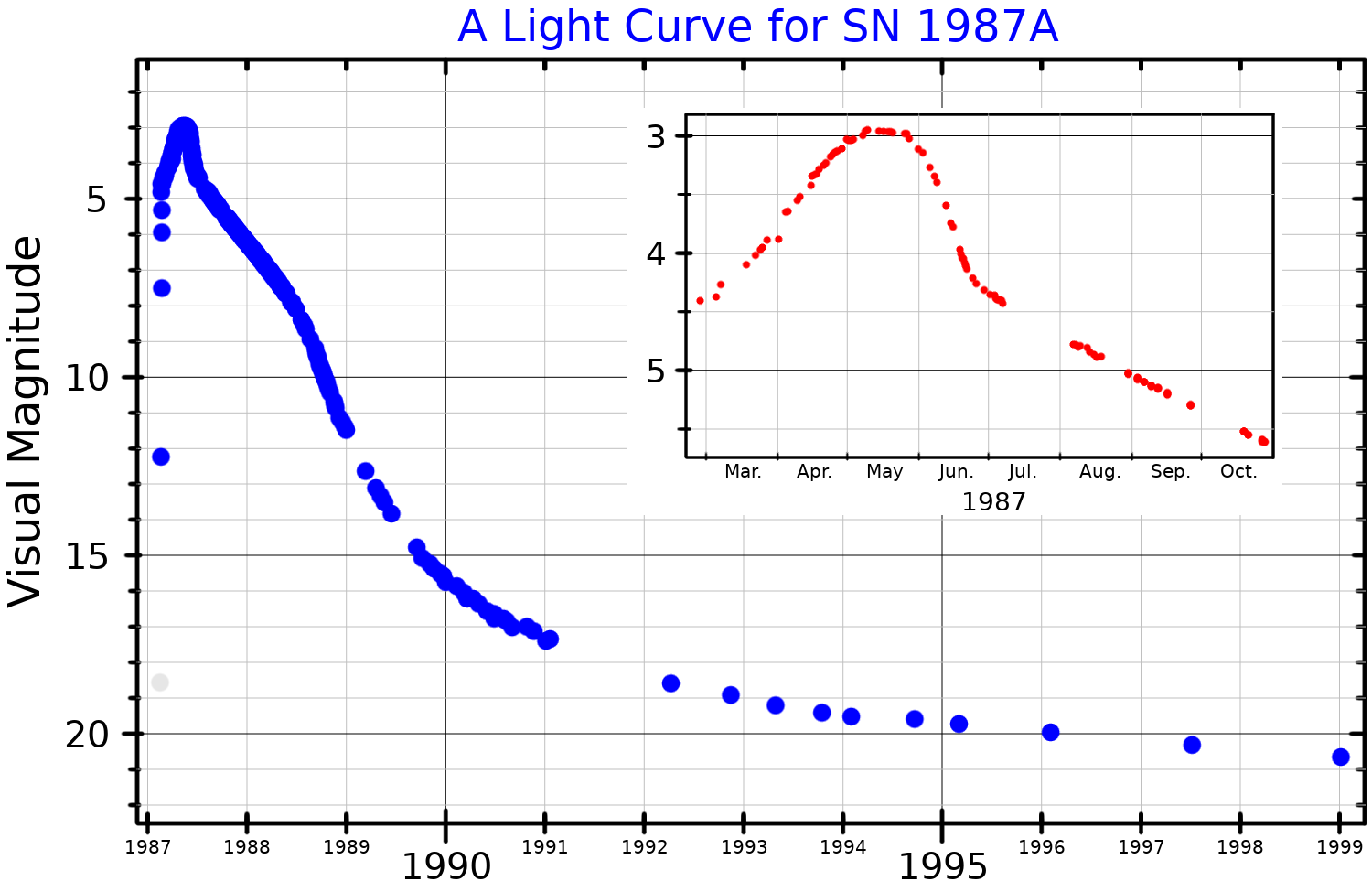
A visual band light curve for SN 1987A. The inset plot shows the time around peak brightness. Plotted from data published by several sources.

After an explosion of a Type II supernova such as SN 1987A, much of the light is produced by the energy from radioactive decay. The radioactivity keeps the remnant hot enough to glow, without which the remnant would dim quickly. The decay of ^{56}Ni through its daughters ^{56}Co to ^{56}Fe produces gamma-ray photons that are absorbed and dominate the heating and thus the luminosity of the ejecta at intermediate times (several weeks) to late times (several months). Energy for the peak of the light curve of SN1987A was provided by the decay of ^{56}Ni to ^{56}Co (half life of 6 days) while energy for the later light curve in particular fit very closely with the 77.3-day half-life of ^{56}Co decaying to ^{56}Fe. Later measurements by space gamma-ray telescopes of the small fraction of the ^{56}Co and ^{57}Co gamma rays that escaped the SN1987A remnant without absorption confirmed earlier predictions that those two radioactive nuclei were the power source.

Because the ^{56}Co in SN1987A has now completely decayed, it no longer supports the luminosity of the SN 1987A ejecta. That is currently powered by the radioactive decay of ^{44}Ti, with a half life of about 60 years but which increases with its ionization state as the decay is purely through electron capture. With this change, X-rays produced by the ring interactions of the ejecta began to contribute significantly to the total light curve. This was noticed by the Hubble Space Telescope as a steady increase in luminosity 10,000 days after the event in the blue and red spectral bands. X-ray lines ^{44}Ti observed by the INTEGRAL space X-ray telescope showed that the total mass of radioactive ^{44}Ti synthesized during the explosion was 3.1 ± 0.8×10^{−4} M_{☉}.

Observations of the radioactive power from their decays in the 1987A light curve have measured accurate total masses of the ^{56}Ni, ^{57}Ni, and ^{44}Ti created in the explosion, which agree with the masses measured by gamma-ray line space telescopes and provides nucleosynthesis constraints on the computed supernova model.

== Interaction with circumstellar material ==
Sequence of HST images from 1994 to 2009, showing the collision of the expanding remnant with a ring of material ejected by the progenitor 20,000 years before the supernova

The three bright rings around SN 1987A that were visible after a few months in images by the Hubble Space Telescope are material from the stellar wind of the progenitor. These rings were ionized by the ultraviolet flash from the supernova explosion, and consequently began emitting in various emission lines. These rings did not "turn on" until several months after the supernova and the process can be very accurately studied through spectroscopy. The rings are large enough that their angular size can be measured precisely: the inner ring is 0.808 arcseconds (3.92 microradians) in radius. The time light traveled to brighten the inner ring gives its radius of 0.66 (ly) light years. Using this as the base of a right angle triangle and the angular size as seen from the Earth for the local angle, one can use basic trigonometry to calculate the distance to SN 1987A, which is about 168,000 light-years. (Note: 0.66/(3.92×10^{−6}) ≈ 168000) The material from the explosion is catching up with the material expelled during both its red and blue supergiant phases and heating it, so we observe ring structures about the star.

Around 2001, the expanding (>7,000 km/s) supernova ejecta collided with the inner ring. This caused its heating and the generation of x-rays—the x-ray flux from the ring increased by a factor of three between 2001 and 2009. A part of the x-ray radiation, which is absorbed by the dense ejecta close to the center, is responsible for a comparable increase in the optical flux from the supernova remnant in 2001–2009. This increase of the brightness of the remnant reversed the trend observed before 2001, when the optical flux was decreasing due to the decaying of ^{44}Ti isotope.

A study reported in June 2015, using images from the Hubble Space Telescope and the Very Large Telescope taken between 1994 and 2014, shows that the emissions from the clumps of matter making up the rings are fading as the clumps are destroyed by the shock wave. It is predicted the ring would fade away between 2020 and 2030. These findings are also supported by the results of a three-dimensional hydrodynamic model which describes the interaction of the blast wave with the circumstellar nebula. The model also shows that X-ray emission from ejecta heated up by the shock will be dominant very soon, after which the ring would fade away. As the shock wave passes the circumstellar ring it will trace the history of mass loss of the supernova's progenitor and provide useful information for discriminating among various models for the progenitor of SN 1987A.

In 2018, radio observations from the interaction between the circumstellar ring of dust and the shockwave confirmed that the shockwave has now left the circumstellar material. It also shows that the speed of the shockwave, which slowed down to 2,300 km/s while interacting with the dust in the ring, has now re-accelerated to 3,600 km/s.

== Condensation of warm dust in the ejecta ==
Images of the SN 1987A debris obtained with the instruments T-ReCS at the 8-m Gemini telescope and VISIR at one of the four VLT. Dates are indicated. An HST image is inserted at the bottom right (credits Patrice Bouchet, CEA-Saclay)

Soon after the SN 1987A outburst, three major groups embarked in a photometric monitoring of the supernova: the South African Astronomical Observatory (SAAO), the Cerro Tololo Inter-American Observatory (CTIO), and the European Southern Observatory (ESO). In particular, the ESO team reported an infrared excess which became apparent beginning less than one month after the explosion (March 11, 1987). Three possible interpretations for it were discussed in this work: the infrared echo hypothesis was discarded, and thermal emission from dust that could have condensed in the ejecta was favoured (in which case the estimated temperature at that epoch was ~ 1250 K, and the dust mass was approximately 6.6×10^{−7} M_{☉}). The possibility that the IR excess could be produced by optically thick free-free emission seemed unlikely because the luminosity in UV photons needed to keep the envelope ionized was much larger than what was available, but it was not ruled out in view of the eventuality of electron scattering, which had not been considered.

However, none of these three groups had sufficiently convincing proofs to claim for a dusty ejecta on the basis of an IR excess alone.

Distribution of the dust inside the SN 1987A ejecta, as from the Lucy et al.'s model built at ESO

An independent Australian team advanced several arguments in favour of an echo interpretation. This seemingly straightforward interpretation of the nature of the IR emission was challenged by the ESO group and definitively ruled out after presenting optical evidence for the presence of dust in the SN ejecta. To discriminate between the two interpretations, they considered the implication of the presence of an echoing dust cloud on the optical light curve, and on the existence of diffuse optical emission around the SN. They concluded that the expected optical echo from the cloud should be resolvable, and could be very bright with an integrated visual brightness of magnitude 10.3 around day 650. However, further optical observations, as expressed in SN light curve, showed no inflection in the light curve at the predicted level. Finally, the ESO team presented a convincing clumpy model for dust condensation in the ejecta.

Although it had been thought more than 50 years ago that dust could form in the ejecta of a core-collapse supernova, which in particular could explain the origin of the dust seen in young galaxies, that was the first time that such a condensation was observed. If SN 1987A is a typical representative of its class then the derived mass of the warm dust formed in the debris of core collapse supernovae is not sufficient to account for all the dust observed in the early universe. However, a much larger reservoir of ~0.25 solar mass of colder dust (at ~26 K) in the ejecta of SN 1987A was found with the infrared Herschel Space Telescope in 2011 and confirmed with the Atacama Large Millimeter Array (ALMA) in 2014.

== ALMA observations ==
Following the confirmation of a large amount of cold dust in the ejecta, ALMA has continued observing SN 1987A. Synchrotron radiation due to shock interaction in the equatorial ring has been measured. Cold (20–100K) carbon monoxide (CO) and silicate molecules (SiO) were observed. The data show that CO and SiO distributions are clumpy, and that different nucleosynthesis products (C, O and Si) are located in different places of the ejecta, indicating the footprints of the stellar interior at the time of the explosion.

== Gallery ==
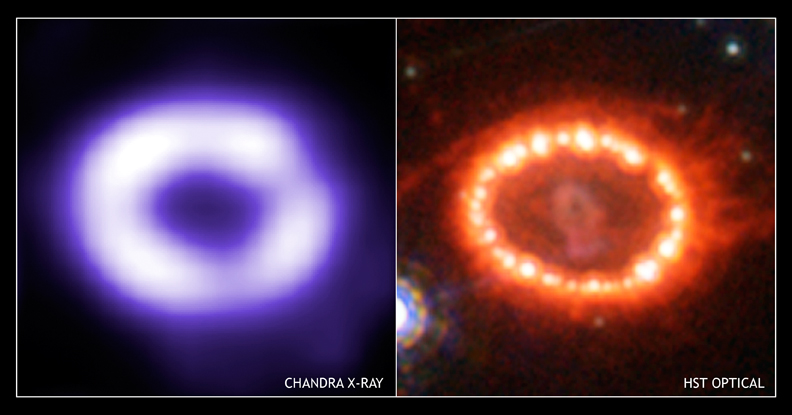
The expanding ring-shaped remnant of SN 1987A and its interaction with its surroundings, seen in X-ray and visible light.

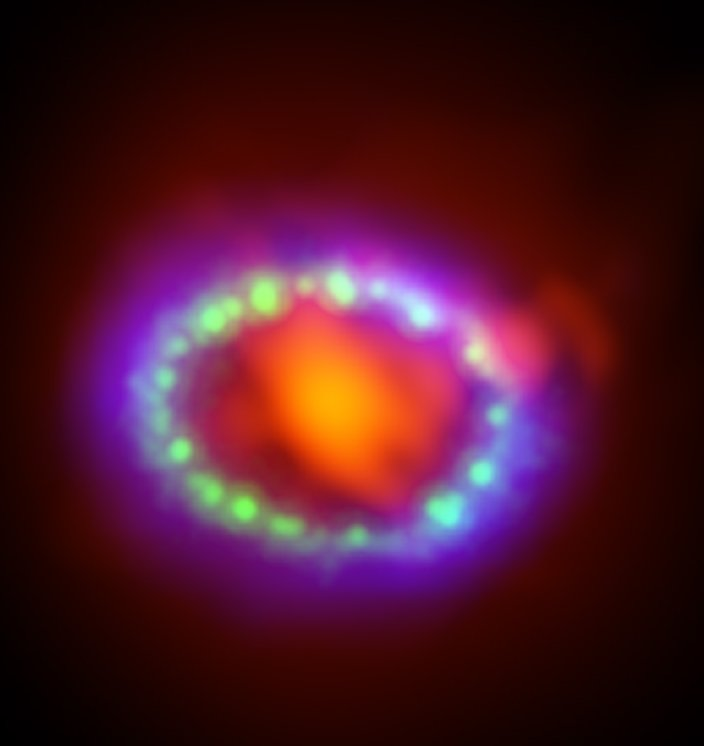
Composite of ALMA, Hubble and Chandra data, showing newly formed dust in the center of the remnant and the expanding shock wave

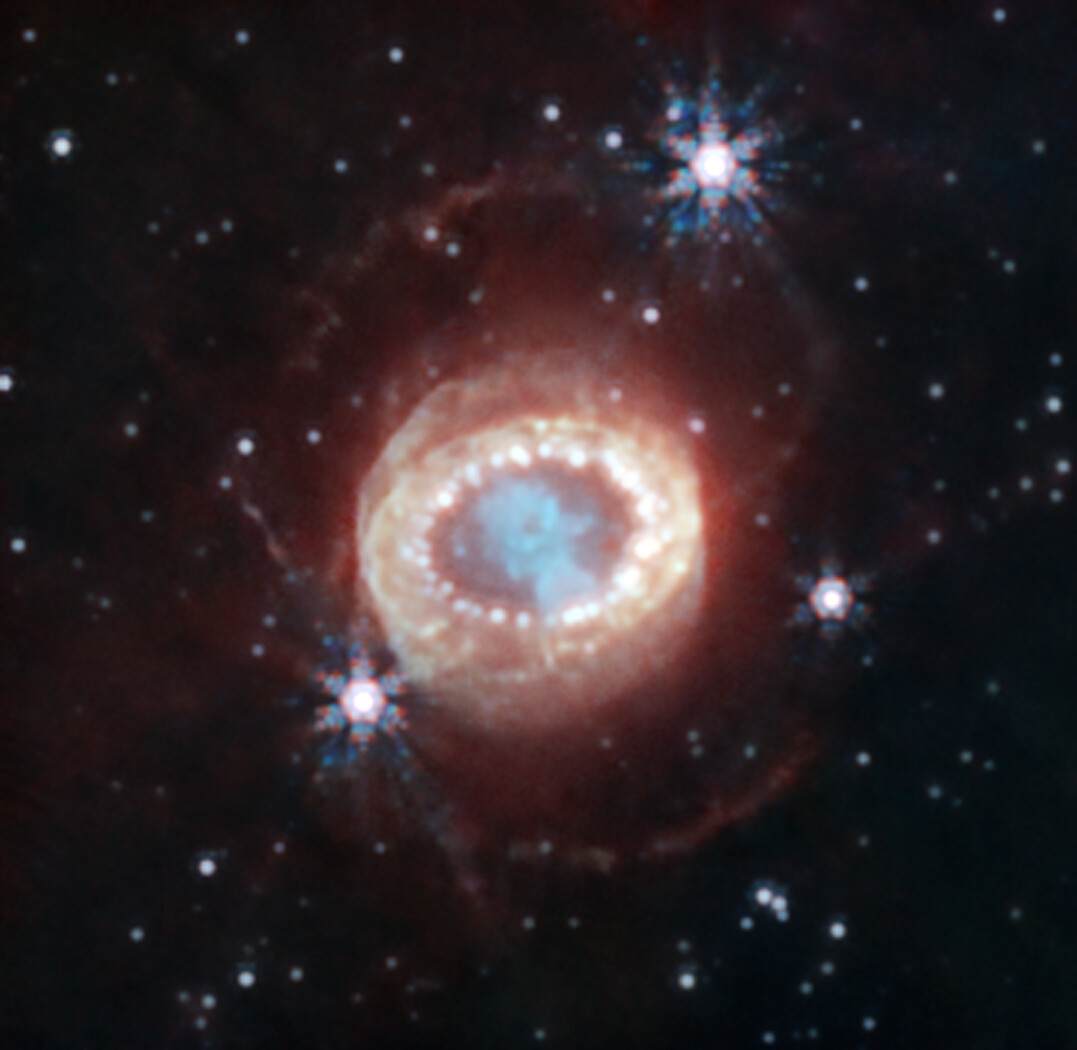
NASA/ESA/CSA James Webb Space Telescope image of the supernova remnant

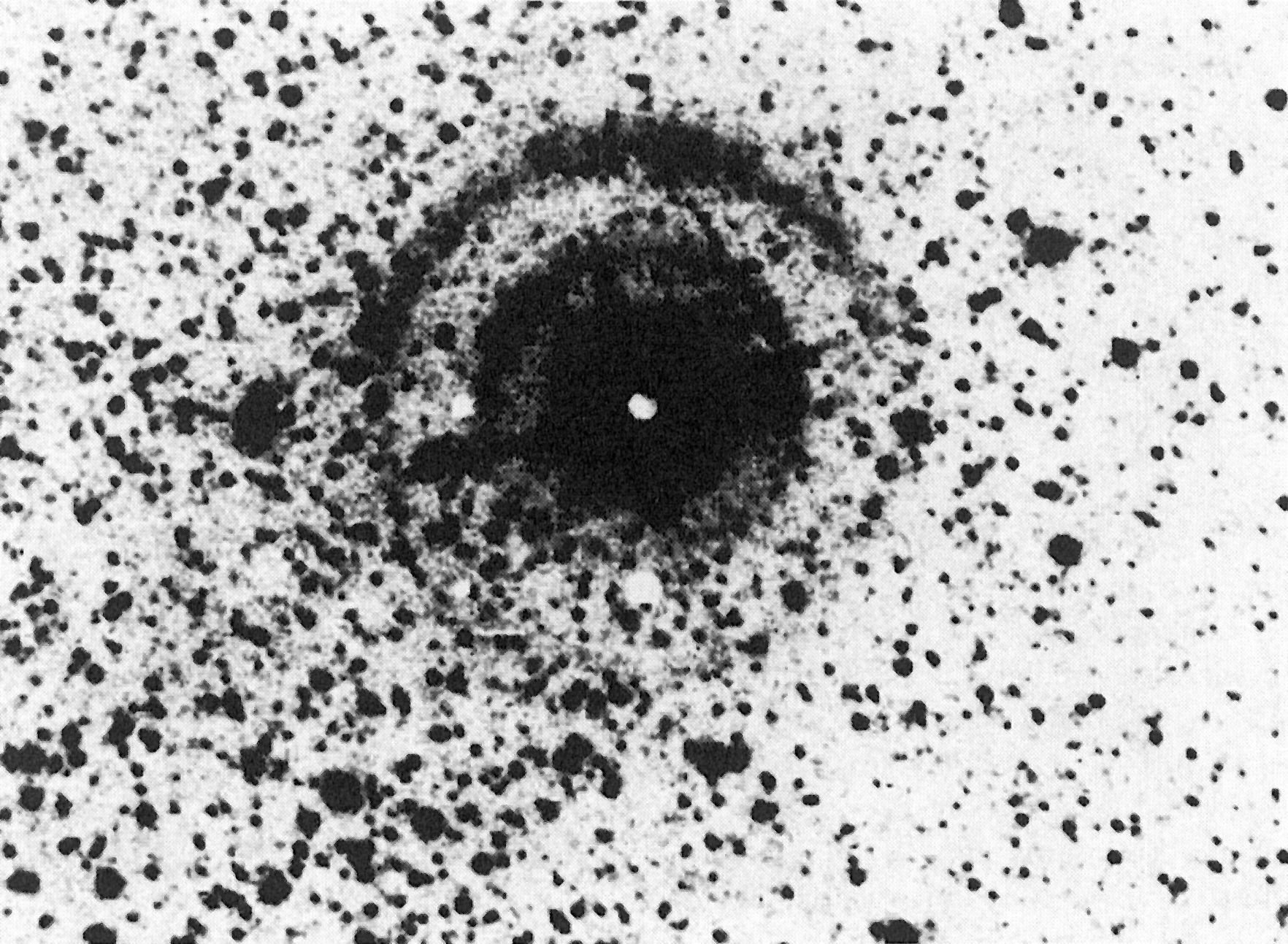
The light echo of Supernova 1987A

== See also ==
- History of supernova observation
- List of supernovae
- List of supernova candidates
- List of supernova remnants

== Sources ==
- Graves, Genevieve J. M.; et al. (2005). "Limits from the Hubble Space Telescope on a point source in SN 1987A". Astrophysical Journal. 629 (2): 944–959. arXiv:astro-ph/0505066. Bibcode:2005ApJ...629..944G. doi:10.1086/431422. S2CID 15453028.
- Kafatos, Minas; Michalitsianos, Andrew, eds. (1988). Supernova 1987A in the Large Magellanic Cloud. New York: Cambridge University Press. ISBN 978-0-521-35575-9.
  - Walborn, Nolan R. "Images and spectrograms of Sanduleak —69°202, the SN 1987a". In Kafatos & Michalitsianos (1988).
  - Gaskell, C. Martin; Keel, William C. "Another Supernova with a Blue Progenitor". In Kafatos & Michalitsianos (1988).
