= McMath =

McMath may refer to:

- Alwyn McMath, cyclist
- Bob McMath, historian
- Francis Charles McMath (1867–1938), engineer and astronomer
- Ginger Rogers (1911–1995), American actress and dancer, born Virginia McMath
- Jahi McMath (2000–2018), American citizen
- Peggy McMath, American kidnapping victim
- Racey McMath (born 1999), American football player
- Robert Raynolds McMath (1891–1962), solar astronomer
- Sid McMath (1912–2003), American politician

== See also ==
- 1955 McMath
- McMath (crater)
- McMath Middle School
- McMath Secondary School
- McMath–Hulbert Observatory
- McMath–Pierce solar telescope
