= Detroit Observatory =

- U.S. National Register of Historic Places
- Michigan State Historic Site
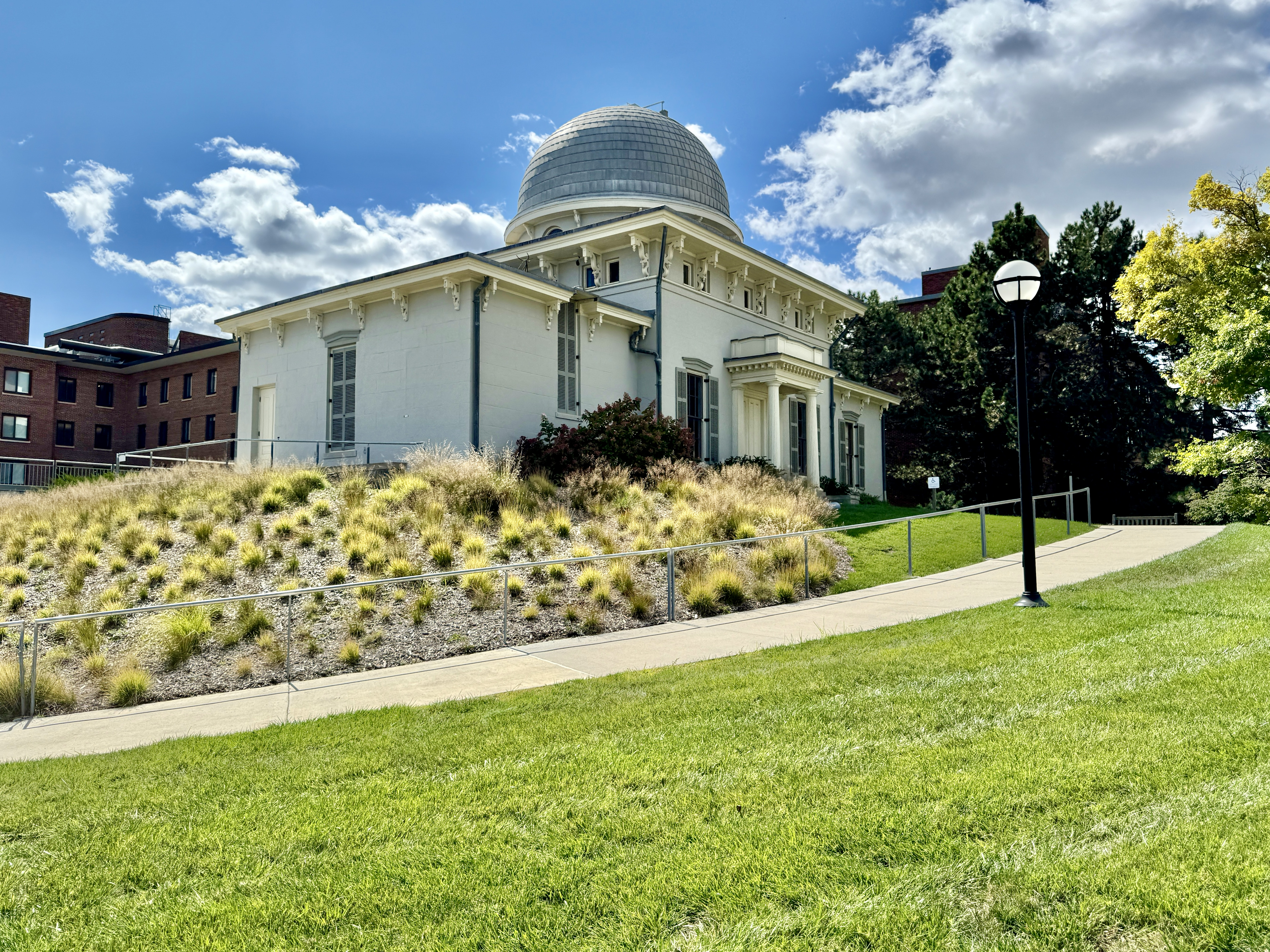
- Interactive map of Detroit Observatory
- Location: Observatory and Ann Sts., Ann Arbor, Michigan
- Coordinates: 42°16′54″N 83°43′54″W
- Area: less than one acre
- Built: 1853
- Built by: George Bird
- Architect: Richard Harrison Bull
- Architectural style: Greek Revival, Italianate
- NRHP reference No.: 73000960

Significant dates
- Added to NRHP: September 20, 1973
- Designated MSHS: February 19, 1958

The Detroit Observatory is a historic observatory on the campus of the University of Michigan in Ann Arbor, Michigan. The Detroit Observatory is located on the corner of Ann Street and its namesake Observatory Street, on a hill overlooking the Huron River valley. It was built in 1854, and was the first scientific research facility at the University of Michigan and one of the oldest observatories of its type in the nation. It was designated a Michigan State Historic Site in 1958 and placed on the National Register of Historic Places in 1973.

== Building the Observatory ==
Henry Philip Tappan was inaugurated as the president of the University of Michigan in December 1852, and in his inaugural speech appealed to the citizens of Michigan to support research and laboratory space at the university. Immediately afterward, Tappan was approached by Detroit businessman (and former Michigan Attorney General) Henry N. Walker, who offered assistance. Tappan suggested raising funds for an observatory, and Walker agreed to spearhead a fundraising drive. Walker soon raised over $7,000 from the citizens of Detroit, a figure that increased to a total of $18,760 over the next few years. This included $4,000 of Walker's own money, and contributions from Lewis Cass, Henry Porter Baldwin, Senator Zachariah Chandler and others. Additional funds were supplied by the Board of Regents of the University of Michigan, giving a total of $22,000 for the building and instruments.

In 1853, land in Ann Arbor was obtained for the building site, and George Bird of New York was hired to superintend construction of the building. To design the building, Tappan turned to Richard Harrison Bull, a New York University civil engineering professor, amateur astronomer, and former student of Tappan's. Construction was completed in 1854, and the building was named the Detroit Observatory to recognize the benefactors who funded its construction. The building housed a 12 5/8-inch (320 mm) Henry Fitz Jr. refracting telescope in the dome. The Fitz was the third largest refracting telescope in the world when it was installed in 1857. A 6-inch (150 mm) Pistor & Martins meridian circle was installed in the east wing, while the west wing served as a library and office space for the director.

== Later additions and modifications to the building ==
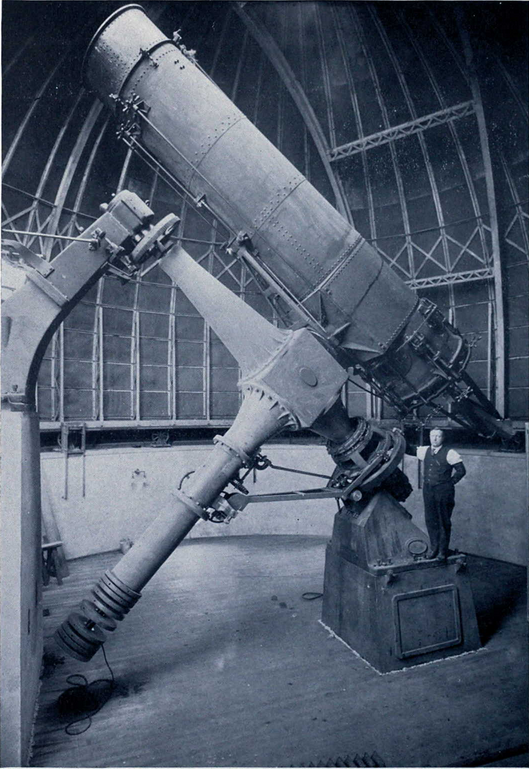
University of Michigan telescope, c. 1912

In 1890, the dome rotation mechanisms were revamped. In 1868, a director's residence was added on the west end of the building. The residence was enlarged and improved in 1905–06, and another, larger wing containing academic and office space was added in 1908. The 1908 addition included a second dome and space for a new 37 1/2-inch (950 mm) reflecting telescope. The director's residence was demolished in 1954 to make way for the expansion of nearby Couzens Hall; the 1908 addition was demolished in 1976.

The function of the Detroit Observatory on campus was gradually taken over by other University of Michigan observatories. The observatories of the University of Michigan include the Detroit Observatory (1854), the Angell Hall Observatory (a student observatory, 1927), the Lamont–Hussey Observatory (South Africa, 1928) and the McMath–Hulbert Observatory (Lake Angelus, Michigan, 1930).

The astronomy department moved from the building in 1963, and the Detroit Observatory was used first as a library, then as a storeroom. It soon became derelict, and in the 1970s was threatened with complete demolition. However, the building was placed on the National Register of Historic Places in 1973, and restored in 1997–98. In 2005, the Detroit Observatory became a division of the Bentley Historical Library.

In 2009, as part of the Astronomy Theme Semester in honor of the International Year of Astronomy, The Bentley and the Department of Astronomy began hosting regular public events and select classes at the observatory. In 2019, the building closed for construction of the Classroom and Accessibility Addition intended to support expanded programming, reopening in April 2022.

== Astronomy and other sciences at the Detroit Observatory ==
The faculty of the Detroit Observatory made significant contributions to the development of American astronomy in the second half of the 19th century. The observatory's first director, Franz Brünnow, was recruited to the University of Michigan by President Tappan in 1856. Brünnow was an astronomer at the Royal Observatory in Berlin, then under the direction of Johann Franz Encke, when Tappan met him. Brünnow agreed to oversee on Tappan's behalf the fabrication of the meridian circle telescope by the German firm Pistor & Martins. When Brünnow expressed admiration for the quality of the instrument, Tappan took the opportunity to invite him to Michigan. Possibly encouraged by Encke and Alexander von Humboldt, Brünnow accepted. He was already well known for his presence at the discovery of Neptune in 1846 and for his textbook Lerhbuch der Sphärischen Astronomie.

Brünnow augmented the astronomy curriculum at the University of Michigan, building it around the "German Method," which emphasized rigorous mathematics, close observation, and reduction of observer, observational, and instrumental error by the method of least squares. At the Detroit Observatory, he implemented the most substantial formal course in astronomy offered in the United States up to that point. The two-year course involved extensive mathematics as well as training on the Detroit Observatory's telescopes. Brünnow's own analysis of the tolerances of the Pistor & Martins meridian circle was seen for many years as a masterpiece of the method. Brünnow himself carried out a research program on asteroids, comets, and stellar parallax. He launched the journal Astronomical Notices, the first academic journal at the University of Michigan and one of the first in the country; Astronomical Notices published the work of American and European astronomers.

The legacy of the program that Brünnow launched was that by the end of the century, by one estimate, about a quarter of the leading astronomers and meteorologists in the United States had trained at the Detroit Observatory. It was, as Cleveland Abbe said, "the place to study astronomy".

Brünnow's student James Craig Watson became the second director of the Observatory in 1863. Watson had served as acting director for one year in 1859–60, during which Brünnow had gone to serve as associate director of the Dudley Observatory in Albany. Watson continued the rigorous program of education and research that Brünnow had started — although he was by many reports an indifferent instructor, except with those in whom he saw significant talent for astronomy. He was less inclined than Brünnow to give students time at the telescopes, which led to student complaints. Finally in 1878, Watson obtained funds from the federal government to erect a small observatory southeast of the Detroit Observatory to observe the transit of Mercury. That observatory was subsequently dedicated to student use and included a three-inch transit telescope and a 3-inch (76 mm) transit telescope and a 6-inch (150 mm) equatorial refractor. The student observatory was relocated to the west side of the main observatory in 1908 and again relocated in 1926 to the roof of Angell Hall.

Watson was renowned for his observational and mathematical skill. He was for many years engaged in an informal competition with C.H.F. Peters of Hamilton College to discover asteroids. During the period 1863 to 1877 Watson discovered a total of 22 asteroids, or nearly a quarter of the asteroids discovered during that period. Among Watson's most significant accomplishments was the discovery of six asteroids in one year, 1868, an unprecedented achievement for which he was awarded the Lalande Prize by the French Academic of Sciences. Watson also undertook research into comets and became embroiled in controversy over his claim to have discovered the intra-Mercurial planet Vulcan. He worked extensively on mapping the Washington Zones and made other contributions. However, Watson left the University of Michigan in 1879 to oversee construction of the Washburn Observatory at the University of Wisconsin, having failed to convince the Regents of the University of Michigan to fund a larger telescope for the Detroit Observatory. He died unexpectedly shortly after moving to Wisconsin.

== Observatory directors and notable students ==
Tappan recruited Franz Brünnow as the first director of the observatory in 1854. Among Brünnow's students during his tenure at the Detroit Observatory were Asaph Hall, De Volson Wood, Cleveland Abbe, and James Craig Watson. Brünnow stayed until 1863, when he was succeeded by James Craig Watson. Watson served for 16 years, and among his students were Otto Julius Klotz, Robert Simpson Woodward, George Cary Comstock, Marcus Baker, and John Martin Schaeberle. The full list of directors of the Detroit Observatory is as follows:

Name	Dates of service	Notes
Franz Brünnow	1854–1863	
James Craig Watson	1863–1879	
Mark W. Harrington	1879–1891	
Asaph Hall Jr.	1892–1905	
William J. Hussey	1905-1926; 1891-1892 (acting)	
Ralph H. Curtiss	1927–1929; 1926 (acting)	
Heber D. Curtis	1930–1941	
W. Carl Rufus	1929–1930 (acting); 1942–1945 (acting)	
A. D. Maxwell	1945–1946 (acting)	
Leo Goldberg	1946–1960	
Freeman D. Miller	1960–1961 (acting)	
Orren C. Mohler	1962–1970	
W. Albert Hiltner	1970–1982	

== Building description ==
The Detroit Observatory, located on the campus of the University of Michigan, is a two-story hip roof rectangular frame structure, 33 feet (10 m) on a side, flanked by two one-story wings, each 19 feet (5.8 m) by 29 feet (8.8 m). The design is typical of observatories built in the 19th century. The structure is constructed of solid brick clad with stucco originally painted to resemble granite blocks. It is capped with a large revolving dome built of wood and canvas, 21 feet (6.4 m) in diameter. A small portico covers the front entrance.

== See also ==
- List of astronomical observatories
