= Peach Mountain Observatory =

Observatory in Michigan, US

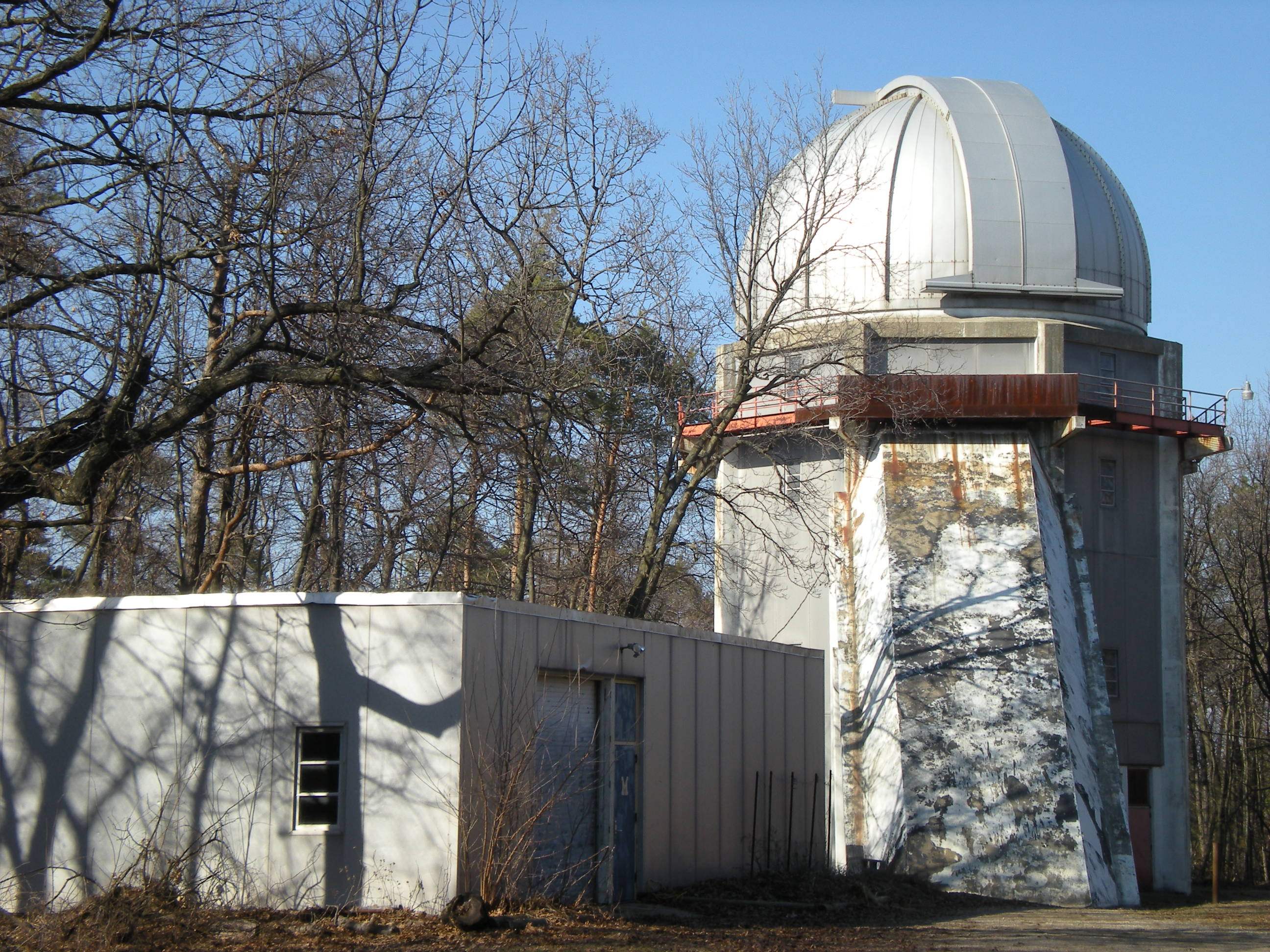
- Organization: University of Michigan
- Location: Dexter, Michigan
- Coordinates: 42.3988°N 83.9357°W
- Altitude: 315 meters (1,033 ft)
- Established: 1955
- Website: Peach Mountain Observatory

Telescopes
- Peach Mountain Radio Telescope: 26 m reflector
- McMath-Hulbert Telescope: 0.6 m reflector

The Peach Mountain Observatory (PMO) is an astronomical observatory owned and operated by the University of Michigan (UM). It is located near the village of Dexter, Michigan (USA), about 20 kilometers (12 miles) northwest of Ann Arbor. It was opened in 1955, and is used for research, instruction, and amateur observing.

Other observatories that UM has operated include the Detroit Observatory (Ann Arbor, Michigan, 1854), the Angell Hall Observatory (Ann Arbor, Michigan, 1927), the Lamont–Hussey Observatory (South Africa, 1928), the McMath–Hulbert Observatory (Lake Angelus, Michigan, 1930), and the Portage Lake Observatory (Dexter, Michigan, 1948).

== Telescopes ==
- The 26 m (85 ft) Peach Mountain Radio Telescope is parabolic reflector built in 1958 with funds provided by the United States Navy Office of Naval Research. Since the mid-1960s it has focused on the monitoring the flux density and linear polarization of radio emissions from active extragalactic objects. Use of the telescope ceased after 2010.
- The 0.6 m (24 in) McMath–Hulbert Telescope, formally known as Francis C. McMath Memorial 24-Inch Reflecting Telescope, was built in 1940 and installed at the nearby McMath–Hulbert Observatory. It was dismantled in 1958 and then re-installed in a new building at PMO in 1959. UM stopped using the telescope in 1979 and transferred control to the University Lowbrow Astronomers, an amateur astronomy club at UM.
- A 8.5 m (28 ft) radio telescope was completed in 1956, but it has not been used for decades. The control building continues to be used by the UM Astronomy Department.

== See also ==
- List of astronomical observatories
