= Portage Lake Observatory =

Observatory in Michigan, US

- Organization: University of Michigan
- Location: Dexter, Michigan
- Coordinates: 42.4035°N 83.9245°W
- Altitude: 313 meters (1,027 ft)
- Established: 1948
- Closed: 1975

Telescopes
- 52-inch Telescope: 1.3 m reflector
- H. D. Curtis Telescope: 0.9 m reflector

The Portage Lake Observatory (PLO) was an astronomical observatory owned and operated by the University of Michigan (UM). It was located near the village of Dexter, Michigan (USA), about 20 kilometers (12 miles) northwest of Ann Arbor. Construction at the site began in 1948, and the facility was closed in 1975.

Other observatories that UM has operated include the Detroit Observatory (Ann Arbor, Michigan, 1854), the Angell Hall Observatory (Ann Arbor, Michigan, 1927), the Lamont–Hussey Observatory (South Africa, 1928), the McMath–Hulbert Observatory (Lake Angelus, Michigan, 1930), and the Peach Mountain Observatory (Dexter, Michigan, 1955).

== Telescopes ==
- A 1.32 m (52 in) reflecting telescope was built by Tinsley Laboratories in 1969 and installed at PLO the same year. In 1975 it was moved to Kitt Peak National Observatory near Tucson, Arizona, where it is now known as the McGraw-Hill Telescope.
- The 0.92 m (36 in) Heber Doust Curtis Telescope is a Schmidt camera that began operating at PLO in 1950. It was moved to the Cerro Tololo Inter-American Observatory in Chile in 1967, where it is referred to as the Curtis Schmidt Telescope.

== See also ==
- MDM Observatory
- List of astronomical observatories
