= McBath =

McBath is a surname. Notable people with the surname include:

- Darcel McBath (born 1985), American football player
- Lucy McBath (born 1960), American politician
- Mark McBath (born 1957), American football player
- Mike McBath (born 1946), American football player and businessman

== See also ==
- McMath
