= Praga Lady =

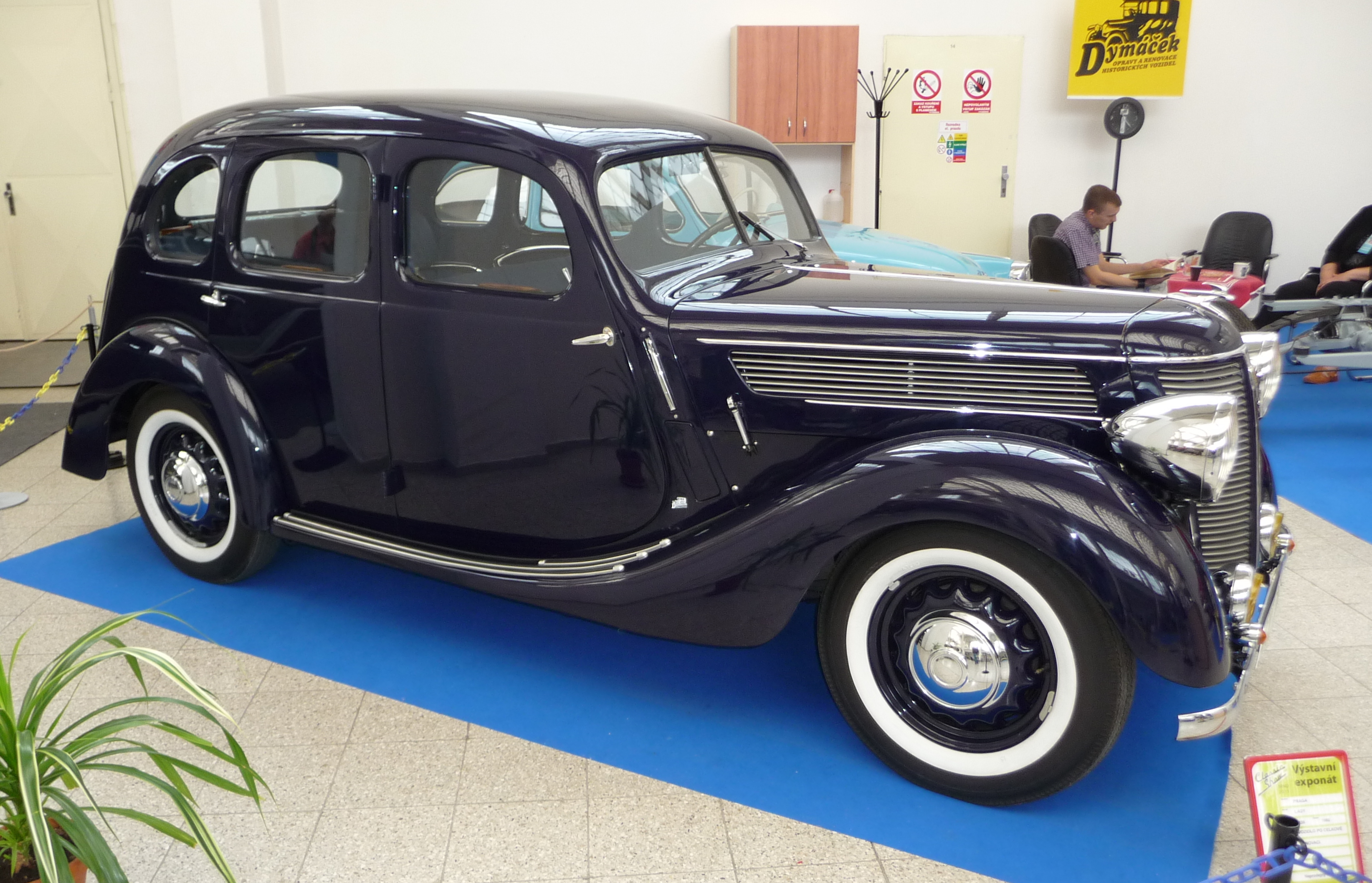
- 1938 Praga Lady

Overview
- Manufacturer: Praga
- Production: 1935–1947; 5,000 units produced

Body and chassis
- Class: Mid-size car (D)
- Body style: 2/4-door saloon; 2-door convertible; 2-door pick-up truck
- Layout: FR

Powertrain
- Engine: 1447 cc SV I4; 1661 cc SV I4
- Transmission: 3-speed manual

Dimensions
- Wheelbase: 2.65 m (104 in)
- Length: 4.42 m (174 in)
- Width: 1.6 m (63 in)
- Height: 1.585 m (62 in)
- Curb weight: 1,150 kg (2,535 lb)

Chronology
- Predecessor: Praga Piccolo 307

The Praga Lady was a mid-sized car that was built in eight series and replaced the Piccolo 307. First introduced in 1935, it continued to be built until 1947. It was most common as a four-door saloon but also available with two doors or as a convertible and pick-up truck. A variety of ambulance versions were also built. The first series (1935-1937) was also available as a two-seat roadster, bodied by Oldřich Uhlík in Prague.

It reached a maximum speed of 100 kilometres per hour (62 mph) and consumed fuel at a rate of 11 litres per 100 kilometres (26 mpg_{‑imp}; 21 mpg_{‑US}). It was based on the Piccolo 307. Bodywork consisted of a wooden frame covered by sheet metal. The Lady received the larger Super Piccolo engine after the first 150 cars had been built (often called "Lady 307" in retrospect), increasing the displacement from the original Piccolo 307 engine's 1.45 litres (88 cu in) to 1.7 litres (101 cu in). Power went from 28 PS (20.6 kW) to 35 PS (25.7 kW). This engine has an aluminium head of Ricardo's "turbulent head" design and Bohnalite pistons. Maximum speed and fuel consumption increased correspondingly, to 110 km/h (68 mph) and 12 L/100 km (24 mpg_{‑imp}; 20 mpg_{‑US}).

The bodywork consisted of steel mounted on a wooden frame and received frequent updates. The car had a traditional X-frame but was unusual in having an independent front suspension and a central lubrication system. These often proved troublesome and were usually disconnected after a few years. About 4600 had been built when production was halted in 1941. The car re-entered production after the end of World War II, with about 400 more being built. The now nationalized concern built this small series for official use. Praga proceeded to concentrate exclusively on trucks and buses.

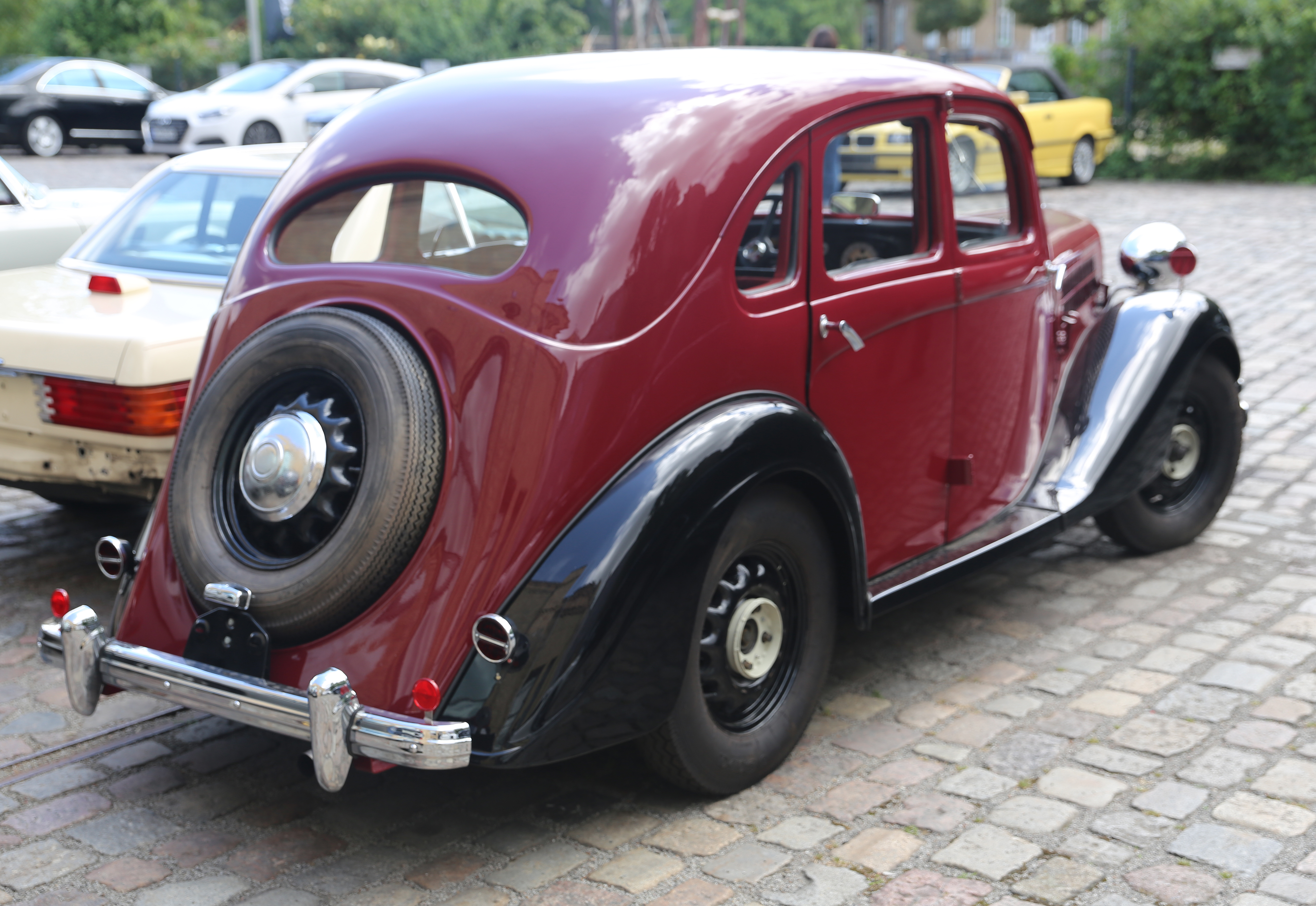
Rear view of a 1937 four-door saloon

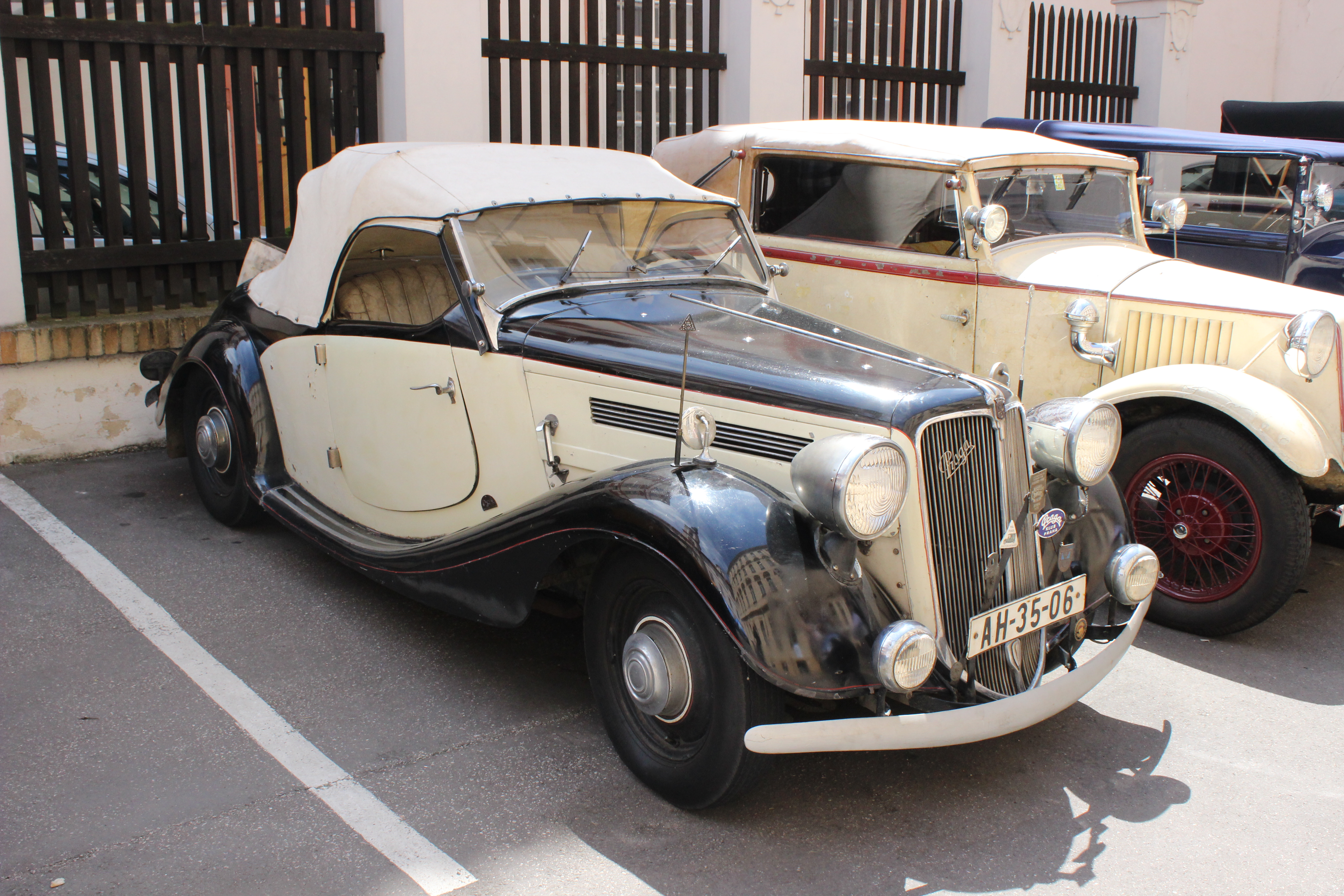
First series Praga Lady Roadster with bodywork by Oldřich Uhlík
