= Angell Hall Observatory =

Observatory in Michigan, US

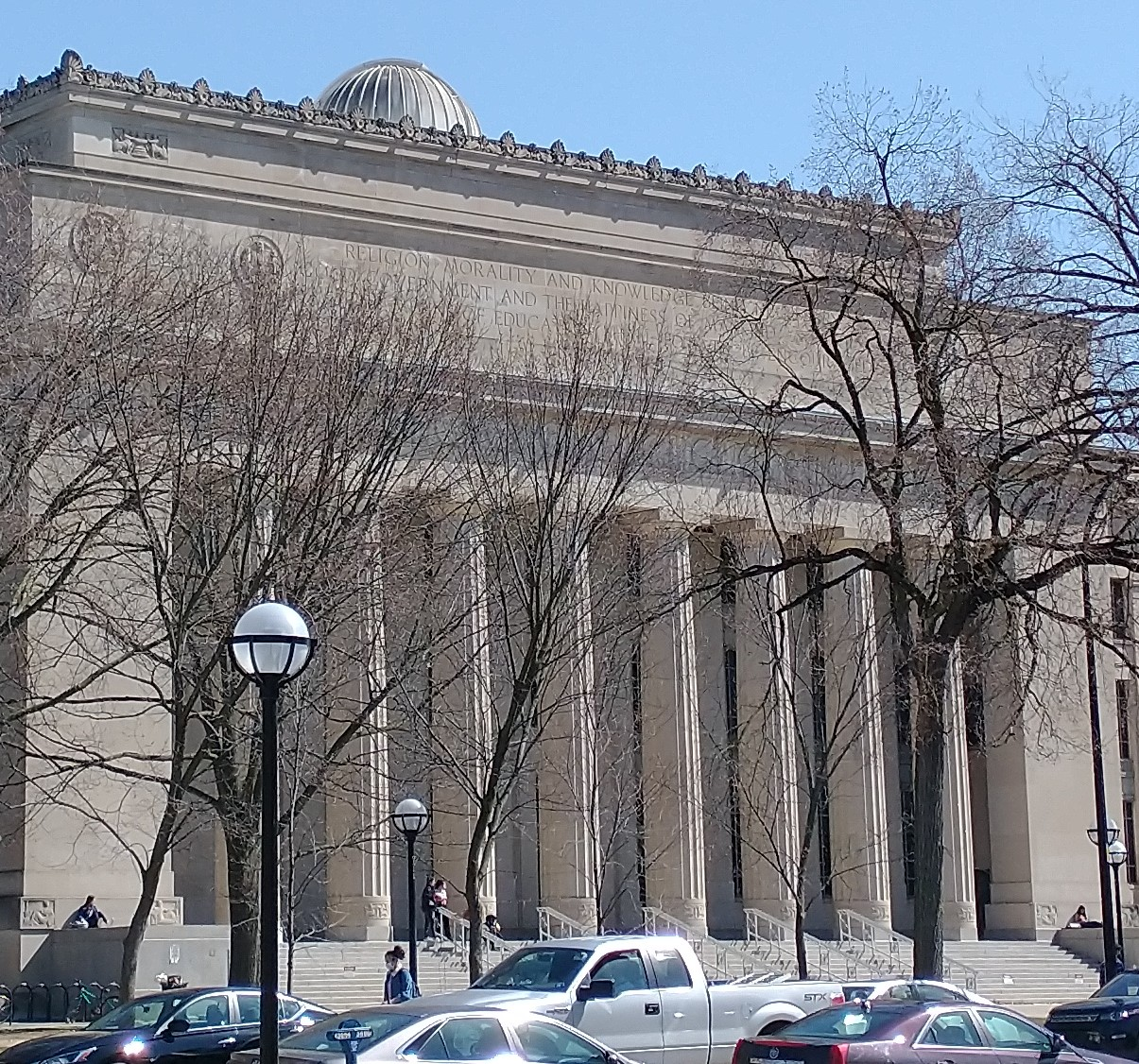
- Organization: University of Michigan
- Observatory code: 767
- Location: Ann Arbor, Michigan
- Coordinates: 42°16′36″N 83°44′24″W
- Established: 1927
- Website: lsa.umich.edu/astro

Angell Hall Observatory is an astronomical observatory owned and operated by University of Michigan. It is located on the UM Central Campus on top of Angell Hall in Ann Arbor, Michigan (US). It has a computer-controlled 0.4-m Cassegrain telescope in its single dome, and a small radio telescope on the roof. In the past it has housed a large, clock-driven refracting telescope and a reflecting telescope in side-by-side domes. The current telescope was manufactured by DFM Engineering and installed in December 1994.

Other observatories that UM has operated include the Detroit Observatory (1854), the Lamont–Hussey Observatory (South Africa, 1928), the McMath–Hulbert Observatory (Lake Angelus, Michigan, 1930), the Portage Lake Observatory (near Dexter, Michigan, 1948), and the Peach Mountain Observatory (near Dexter, Michigan, 1958).

== See also ==
- List of observatories
