= Adolph Lincoln Nelson =

American inventor

Adolph Lincoln Nelson (1888–?) was an American inventor. He was the inventor of the Nelson Bohnalite piston. He was born in Oneida, Illinois, raised in nearby Galesburg and migrated to Indianapolis where he worked for Premier Motor car. When that company folded he went to Detroit after a stint in Dayton working for the Army Air Force on the synchronized airplane-based machine gun. He married Ada Gruber and had 7 Children. They lived in the Palmer Woods area of Detroit. (Parkside)

Certain materials from his engineering career are in the archives at the University of Michigan Bentley Historical Library.
