= Robert Raynolds McMath =

American astronomer

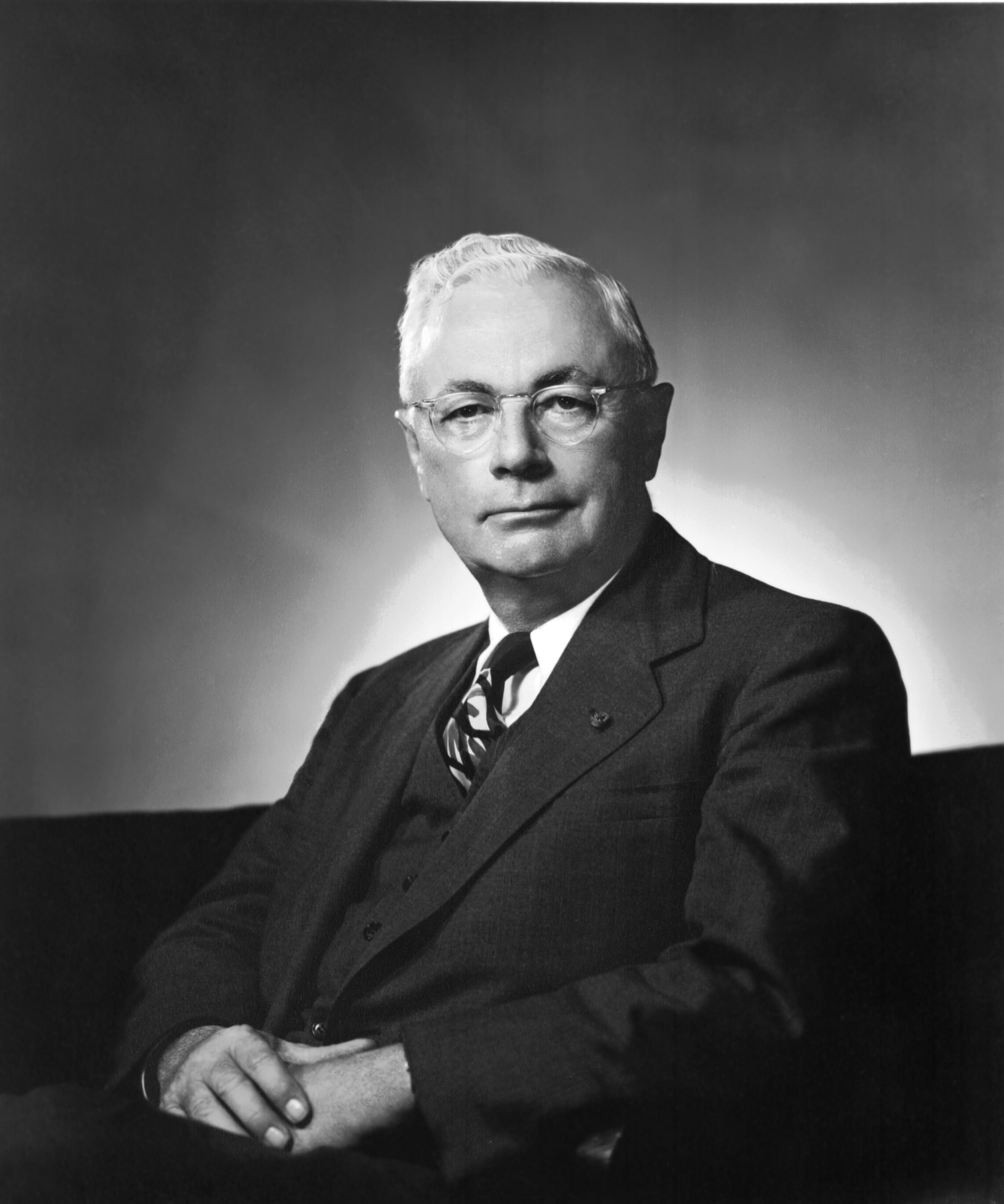
- Born: May 11, 1891; Detroit, Michigan
- Died: January 2, 1962 (aged 70); Bloomfield Hills, Michigan
- Known for: Solar astronomy
- Parent: Francis C. McMath
- Awards: Rittenhouse Medal (1936)
- Scientific career
- Fields: Astronomy

Robert Raynolds McMath (May 11, 1891 – January 2, 1962) was an American solar astronomer.

McMath was a bridge engineer, businessman, and astronomer. His father, Francis C. McMath, had made a fortune as a bridge builder. They both had a keen interest in amateur astronomy. So in 1922, the McMaths, along with Judge Henry S. Hulbert founded the McMath–Hulbert Observatory in Lake Angelus, Michigan. It was deeded to the University of Michigan in 1931, McMath served as the director of the McMath–Hulbert Observatory until 1961.

In 1932, McMath extended the functionality of the spectroheliograph so that it could record motion pictures of the Sun. This machine is known as a spectroheliokinematograph; with it, he took astonishing moving pictures of solar storms, showing features on the Sun's surface that lasted from seconds to days.

In 1933, he and his father received the Franklin Institute's John Price Wetherill Medal. He was elected to the American Philosophical Society in 1942. In 1958, he was elected to the United States National Academy of Sciences.

McMath was an adviser to the National Science Foundation in its early years and he chaired the panel that advised NSF on the need for a national observatory. A site on Kitt Peak, Arizona was finally chosen for the Kitt Peak National Observatory (KPNO). McMath, along with the eminent astronomer Keith Pierce, built a new, larger solar telescope on Kitt Peak called the McMath–Pierce solar telescope. McMath served as the first president of Association of Universities for Research in Astronomy (AURA) from 1957 to 1958, and thereafter as chairman of the AURA board.

== See also ==
- Peach Mountain Observatory
- McMath (crater)
- 1955 McMath
