= Heber Doust Curtis =

American astronomer

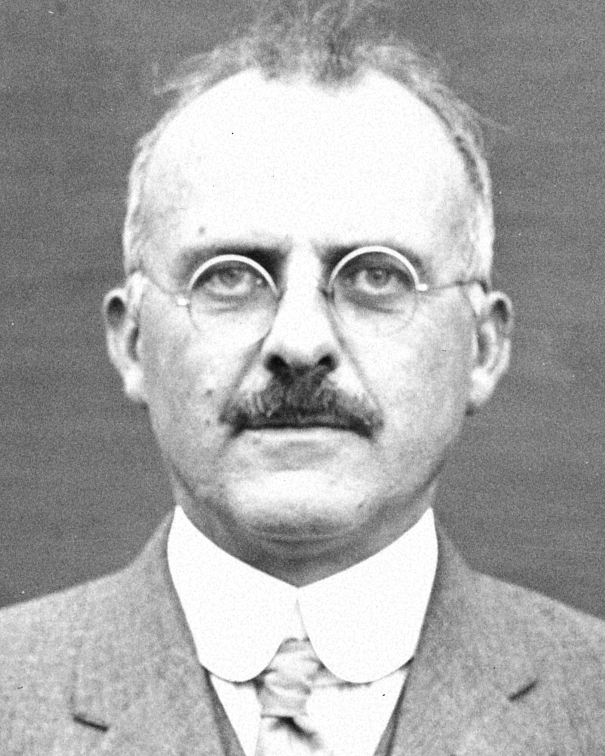
- Born: June 27, 1872; Muskegon, Michigan, U.S.
- Died: January 9, 1942 (aged 69); Ann Arbor, Michigan, U.S.
- Education: University of Michigan, University of Virginia
- Scientific career
- Fields: astronomy

Minor planets discovered: 1
(23400) A913 CF	February 11, 1913	MPC

Heber Doust Curtis (June 27, 1872 – January 9, 1942) was an American astronomer. He participated in 11 expeditions for the study of solar eclipses, and, as an advocate and theorist that additional galaxies existed outside of the Milky Way, was involved in the 1920 Shapley–Curtis Debate concerning the size and galactic structure of the universe.

== Biography ==
Curtis was born on June 27, 1872, the elder son of Orson Blair Curtis and Sarah Eliza Doust.

He studied at the University of Michigan and at the University of Virginia, earning a degree in astronomy from the latter.

From 1902 to 1920 Curtis worked at Lick Observatory, continuing the survey of nebulae initiated by Keeler. He headed up the Lick southern station in Chile from 1905 until 1909, when he returned to take charge of the Crossley telescope. In 1912 he was elected president of the Astronomical Society of the Pacific.

In 1918 he observed Messier 87 and was the first to notice the astrophysical jet which he described as a "curious straight ray ... apparently connected with the nucleus by a thin line of matter."

In 1920 he was appointed director of the Allegheny Observatory. In the same year he participated in the Great Debate with Harlow Shapley (also called the Shapley–Curtis Debate) on the nature of nebulae and galaxies, and the size of the universe. Curtis advocated the now-accepted view that other galaxies apart from the Milky Way existed.

Curtis also invented a type of film plate comparator in about 1925, allowing 2 plates, each 8×10 in, to be compared using a set of prisms and placing the plates on stacked and aligned stages rather than next to one another as was the norm, this allowed the body of the device to measure just 60×51 cm. This device is packed in crates and resided at UCO Lick Observatory as of Aug 2011. His article describing the device appears in the Publications of the Allegheny Observatory, vol. VIII, no. 2.

In 1930 Curtis was appointed director of the University of Michigan observatories, but the shortage of funds following the Great Depression prevented the construction of a large reflector he had designed for the university at Ann Arbor. He contributed to develop the McMath–Hulbert private observatory at Lake Angelus.

Curtis was an opponent of Albert Einstein's theory of relativity.

He died on January 9, 1942.

== Legacy ==
The Heber Doust Curtis Memorial Telescope at the Portage Lake Observatory was dedicated in 1950 in Curtis's memory. It no longer operates, but remains as a memorial to Curtis. A small lunar crater east of the larger crater Picard in Mare Crisium received the official name Curtis.
