= Observatory Theatre =

The Observatory Theatre (Afrikaans:Sterrewagteater) is an observatory in the neighborhood of Naval Hill, Bloemfontein, South Africa, where Sukovs founded a theater in 1978.

== History ==
The Lamont–Hussey Observatory was founded in 1928 and was owned by the University of Michigan. The site was later taken over by the University of the Free State. In 1971, it ceased to be used, and in 1972, it was closed. Since the University no longer needed the building, the municipality of Bloemfontein took over the site and it remained empty for a few years.

In 1978, the municipality made the space available to Sukovs for experimental theatre. The crescent-shaped venue seated 119. It opened in 1979 with the Sukovs production of Die Huigelaar, an Afrikaans translation of Molière's Tartuffe, under the direction of Jannie Gildenhuys. In 1997, the Free State Ensemble took over the theatre and renovated it.

The theatre has fallen into disuse, and was last used for a performance in 2006.
