= Lamont–Hussey Observatory =

- Organization: University of Michigan
- Location: Bloemfontein, Free State
- Coordinates: 29°05′48″S 26°14′10″E
- Altitude: 1,478 metres (4,849 ft)
- Established: 1928
- Closed: 1972

Telescopes
- unnamed telescope: 27-inch refractor
- unnamed telescope: 6-inch refractor

The Lamont–Hussey Observatory (LHO) was an astronomical observatory owned and operated by the University of Michigan (UM). It was located in the city of Bloemfontein, Free State, South Africa. Construction at the site began in 1927, and the facility was closed in 1972.

Other observatories that UM has operated include the Detroit Observatory (Ann Arbor, Michigan, 1854), the Angell Hall Observatory (Ann Arbor, Michigan, 1927), the McMath–Hulbert Observatory (Lake Angelus, Michigan, 1930), the Portage Lake Observatory (Dexter, Michigan, 1948), and the Peach Mountain Observatory (Dexter, Michigan, 1955).

== History ==
The LHO was the project of two people: Robert P. Lamont, an industrialist, and William J. Hussey, a professor of astronomy at UM, and director of the Detroit Observatory. The two men shared a room while attending UM, and were friends from that time. Lamont agreed to fund an observatory in the Southern Hemisphere in 1910. However, the First World War intervened and the project was on hold for several years. In 1923, Hussey visited South Africa and selected Naval Hill in Bloemfontein as the site for the observatory. After the telescope was completed and shipped to South Africa in 1926, Hussey and another UM professor, R. A. Rossiter, left Michigan for the observatory site. During a stopover in London, Hussey died suddenly. Rossiter continued the journey, and oversaw construction of the observatory building for the next two years. He became the director of the LHO when it opened, and remained in that position until retiring in 1952.

The facility in Bloemfontein was largely unused from when Rossiter retired until 1963, when it was officially re-opened by Frank Holden. The observatory was not an important research facility in its later years due to its relatively small telescope, which had been greatly surpassed in size by reflecting telescopes like the 200-inch Hale Telescope. In its last few years, the main task performed was a re-examination of Rossiter's catalogues of binary stars. It was closed in 1972, and two years later the building was given to the Performing Arts Council of Free State in Bloemfontein, which turned it into the Observatory Theatre, also known as the Sterrewag Theatre.

The building became re-used as a planetarium, the first digital planetarium in sub-Saharan Africa, and opened in November 2013. The internal appearance of the original dome, brick walls, and rotation mechanisms has been retained. A suspended and tilted projection dome hangs over the seating area, and a Sky-Skan digital planetarium is now housed inside the Naval Hill Planetarium facility.

== Telescopes ==
The LHO's primary instrument was a 27 in (690 mm) refracting telescope for its entire span of operations. The lenses for the telescope were initially ordered in 1911, but due to the First World War, the two lens blanks were not delivered by Carl Zeiss Jena until 1923. They were then figured by James B. McDowell and Frederick Hageman of John A. Brashear, Co., a process which took over a year. The finished lenses were sent to Ann Arbor, where they were integrated into the great refractor built by the Detroit Observatory's machine shop. The device was tested in Michigan and then shipped to South Africa, where it was installed and began operating in 1928.

The 27-inch telescope's foremost use was to study binary stars, a subject of great interest to both Hussey and Rossiter. In 1956 it was used by Earl C. Slipher to photograph Mars at opposition. In 1974, after closure of the observatory, the telescope was dismantled and the lenses were shipped back to Michigan. The telescope tube and other parts remained in South Africa, and are on display at the Erlich Park Fire Station Museum. In January 2019 the telescope tube and other parts were reassembled as an exhibit at the Naval Hill Planetarium.

A 10.5 in (270 mm) refractor originally located at Mount Wilson Observatory was installed in 1948 and used to search for strong H-alpha-emitting objects. It was removed and sent back to California in 1951.

The fate of a 6 in (150 mm) Alvan Clark & Sons refractor used at LHO is unknown.

== See also ==
- South African Astronomical Observatory
- List of astronomical observatories
