= 1955 McMath =

Stony main-belt asteroid

Discovery
- Discovered by: Indiana University (Indiana Asteroid Program)
- Discovery site: Goethe Link Obs.
- Discovery date: 22 September 1963

Designations
- Named after: Robert McMath (astronomer, engineer)
- Alternative designations: 1963 SR · 1936 BA; 1949 XN · 1951 EP_{2} 1953 RN · 1963 TK
- Minor planet category: main-belt · Koronis

Orbital characteristics
- Epoch 4 September 2017 (JD 2458000.5)
- Uncertainty parameter 0
- Observation arc: 67.17 yr (24,535 days)
- Aphelion: 3.0388 AU
- Perihelion: 2.6703 AU
- Semi-major axis: 2.8545 AU
- Eccentricity: 0.0645
- Orbital period (sidereal): 4.82 yr (1,762 days)
- Mean anomaly: 32.257°
- Mean motion: 0° 12^{m} 15.84^{s} / day
- Inclination: 1.0053°
- Longitude of ascending node: 258.11°
- Argument of perihelion: 154.10°

Physical characteristics
- Dimensions: 9.759±0.248 km 10.31 km (calculated)
- Synodic rotation period: 5.547±0.0315 h 5.57±0.00 h 5.574±0.002 h 5.5976±0.0315 h
- Geometric albedo: 0.24 (assumed); 0.322±0.041
- Spectral type: S
- Absolute magnitude (H): 11.78±0.045 (R) · 11.9 · 11.97±0.15 (R) · 12.003±0.002 (R) · 12.1 · 12.42±0.53 · 12.498±0.003 (S)

1955 McMath, provisional designation 1963 SR, is a stony Koronis asteroid from the outer region of the asteroid belt, approximately 10 kilometers in diameter.

It was discovered on 22 September 1963, by Indiana University's Indiana Asteroid Program at its Goethe Link Observatory near Brooklyn, Indiana, United States. It was later named after solar astronomer Robert Raynolds McMath.

== Orbit and classification ==
McMath is a stony S-type asteroid and a member of the Koronis family, which is named after 158 Koronis and consists of about 300 known bodies. It orbits the Sun in the outer main-belt at a distance of 2.7–3.0 AU once every 4 years and 10 months (1,762 days). Its orbit has an eccentricity of 0.06 and an inclination of 1° with respect to the ecliptic. The first precovery was taken at Goethe Link Observatory in 1949, extending the asteroid's observation arc by 15 years prior to its discovery. The first (unused) observation at Uccle Observatory dates back to 1936.

== Physical characteristics ==
=== Rotation period ===
It has a well determined rotation period of 5.574±0.002 hours with a brightness amplitude of 0.30 in magnitude (U=3). Between 2011 and 2013, three additional lightcurves with concurring periods of McMath with an amplitude between 0.32 and 0.39 magnitude were obtained through photometric observations in the R- and S-band at the U.S. Palomar Transient Factory in California (U=2/3-/2).

=== Diameter and albedo ===
According to the survey carried out by the NEOWISE mission of NASA's Wide-field Infrared Survey Explorer, McMath measures 9.8 kilometers in diameter and its surface has a high albedo of 0.32, while the Collaborative Asteroid Lightcurve Link assumes a standard albedo for stony members of the Koronis family of 0.24, and calculates a diameter of 10.3 kilometers.

== Naming ==
This minor planet was named after American solar astronomer Robert Raynolds McMath (1891–1962), who was also a bridge engineer and businessman. He was a co-donor and the director of the McMath–Hulbert Observatory in Lake Angelus, Michigan, which was deeded to the University of Michigan. Under his advice, the NSF chose the site at Kitt Peak National Observatory for the McMath–Pierce Solar Telescope.

From the late 1950s, Robert McMath served as the first president of Association of Universities for Research in Astronomy and thereafter as its chairman. The lunar crater McMath is also named in his and his father's honour. The approved naming citation was published by the Minor Planet Center on 1 March 1981 (M.P.C. 5848).
