= 4432 McGraw-Hill =

Main-belt asteroid

Discovery
- Discovered by: S. J. Bus
- Discovery site: Siding Spring Obs.
- Discovery date: 2 March 1981

Designations
- Named after: McGraw-Hill Telescope (at Kitt Peak, Arizona)
- Alternative designations: 1981 ER_{22} · 1964 TV
- Minor planet category: main-belt · (inner) background

Orbital characteristics
- Epoch 23 March 2018 (JD 2458200.5)
- Uncertainty parameter 0
- Observation arc: 53.54 yr (19,555 d)
- Aphelion: 2.8975 AU
- Perihelion: 1.8747 AU
- Semi-major axis: 2.3861 AU
- Eccentricity: 0.2143
- Orbital period (sidereal): 3.69 yr (1,346 d)
- Mean anomaly: 188.28°
- Mean motion: 0° 16^{m} 2.64^{s} / day
- Inclination: 0.4616°
- Longitude of ascending node: 115.15°
- Argument of perihelion: 246.30°

Physical characteristics
- Mean diameter: 3.042±0.643 km 3.43 km (derived)
- Synodic rotation period: inconclusive
- Geometric albedo: 0.20 (assumed); 0.254±0.224
- Spectral type: S (assumed)
- Absolute magnitude (H): 14.5; 14.69

4432 McGraw-Hill, provisional designation 1981 ER_{22}, is a background asteroid from the inner regions of the asteroid belt, approximately 3 kilometers (2 miles) in diameter. It was discovered on 2 March 1981, by American astronomer Schelte Bus at the Siding Spring Observatory in Australia. The likely S-type asteroid was named for the McGraw-Hill Telescope located at Kitt Peak, Arizona.

== Orbit and classification ==
McGraw-Hill is a non-family asteroid from the main belt's background population. It orbits the Sun in the inner asteroid belt at a distance of 1.9–2.9 AU once every 3 years and 8 months (1,346 days; semi-major axis of 2.39 AU). Its orbit has an eccentricity of 0.21 and an inclination of 0° with respect to the ecliptic.

The asteroid was first observed as 1964 TV at Purple Mountain Observatory in October 1964. The body's observation arc begins with a precovery taken at Palomar Observatory in February 1977, or four years prior to its official discovery observation at Siding Spring.

== Physical characteristics ==
McGraw-Hill is an assumed, stony S-type asteroid, in agreement with the albedo (see below) obtained by the Wide-field Infrared Survey Explorer (WISE).

=== Rotation period ===
During the Small Main-Belt Asteroid Lightcurve Survey, McGraw-Hill has been observed photometrically. The observations gave a small brightness variation of 0.06 magnitude but resulted in no useful rotational lightcurve (U=n.a.). As of 2018, the body's rotation period, pole and shape remain unknown.

=== Diameter and albedo ===
According to the survey carried out by the NEOWISE mission of NASA's WISE telescope, McGraw-Hill measures 3.042 kilometers in diameter and its surface has an albedo of 0.254, while the Collaborative Asteroid Lightcurve Link assumes a standard albedo for a stony asteroid of 0.20 and derives a diameter of 3.43 kilometers based on an absolute magnitude of 14.69.

== Naming ==
This minor planet was named after the 1.3-meter McGraw-Hill Telescope located at the MDM Observatory at the Kitt Peak National Observatory site in Arizona, United States. The official naming citation was published by the Minor Planet Center on 18 February 1992 (M.P.C. 19697).
