= William Hussey (astronomer) =

American astronomer (1862–1926)

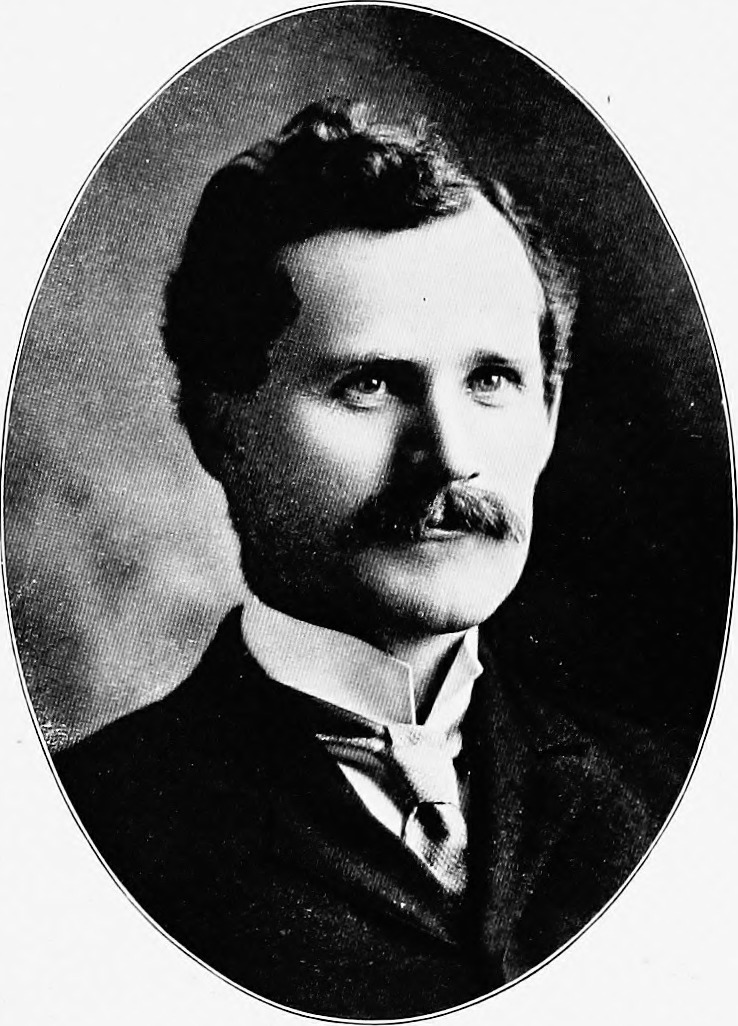
- Born: August 10, 1862; Mendon, Ohio
- Died: October 28, 1926 (aged 64); London, England
- Education: University of Michigan, BS in Civil Engineering (1889)
- Spouse: Ethel Fountain
- Children: Roland Fountain and Alice Lillian
- Scientific career
- Fields: Astronomy
- Workplaces: University of Michigan, Stanford University, Lick Observatory

William Joseph Hussey (August 10, 1862 – October 28, 1926) was an American astronomer.

== Early life and education ==
He was born at Mendon, Ohio, August 10, 1862, the son of John Milton Hussey and Mary Catherine Stevens. He attended the Valparaiso Normal School in 1880 and completed the scientific curriculum with a specialization in education in one year. Afterward, he attended the University of Michigan to study civil engineering.

He had to stop his education in his sophomore year of university due to a lack of funds. During a three-year hiatus from his education he worked as a principal of the schools at Ohio Station, Illinois. During summer breaks, he did clerical work for railroad surveyors in the Northwest. He then returned to the University of Michigan to finish his civil engineering degree in 1889.

== Career ==
After graduating with a BS in civil engineering from the University of Michigan in 1889, he served as assistant in the Nautical Almanac Office of Washington, D.C. He soon returned to Ann Arbor as instructor in mathematics, and became instructor in astronomy in 1891.

He is most famous for the discovery and study of close binary stars. In 1898 to 1899, he observed all binaries discovered by Otto Struve, with at least three observations of each. His amazing efficiency is demonstrated by these numbers: he made 1,920 observations in one year, with a record of 80 in one night. He had travelled all around the world for this research to places such as California, Arizona, and Australia. He also designed many of the telescopes that he used during these studies. At the conclusion of his double star work in 1905, he had discovered and measured 1,327 close binaries. For this work, he was awarded the Lalande Medal in 1906, which he shared with Robert Grant Aitken.

In 1892, he joined the faculty of Stanford University as an assistant professor of astronomy. From 1896 to 1905 he was Astronomer at the Lick Observatory, returning to the faculty of the University of Michigan in 1905 to become professor of astronomy and fifth director of the Detroit Observatory. In 1897, he was elected president of the Astronomical Society of the Pacific. During his time at the Lick Observatory, he took photographs of Comet Rordame. From 1905 to 1912, Hussey served as the secretary of the American Astronomical Society. In 1911, Hussey traveled to the University of La Plata in Argentina to help them develop their observatory and telescopes. In 1912, he went on to earn another degree from Brown University.

=== Time at the University of Michigan ===
As an astronomy professor and director of the Detroit Observatory, Hussey made many meaningful contributions to the astronomy department at the University of Michigan. He was responsible for securing large donations to the observatory and for the installation of a 37 1/2-inch reflecting telescope. He was able to expand the astronomy department from twelve students to over one-hundred. Hussey often argued against any construction developments around the Observatory to protect it from anything that could disrupt observations, such as dirt, dust, and light. In 1912, while Hussey was voyaging across the Atlantic on his way to La Plata University in Argentina, the president of the university, Harry B. Hutchins, and the board of regents decided to build a power plant near the observatory. Hussey and his wife, Ethel Hussey, argued against the plant's development but it was developed despite their opposition. Ethel Hussey was the first president of the Michigan League at the time.

== Death ==
On his way to install a new telescope in South Africa, Hussey died unexpectedly in London, England on October 28, 1926. He had worked for many years in preparation for this project. A crater on Mars was named in his honor. The Lamont–Hussey Observatory in Bloemfontein, Free State, South Africa was also named after him.
