= Richard Alfred Rossiter =

American astronomer (1886–1977)

- Born: December 19, 1886; Oswego, New York, U.S.
- Died: January 26, 1977 (aged 90); Bloemfontein, South Africa
- Education: Wesleyan University; University of Michigan
- Known for: Rossiter–McLaughlin effect
- Spouse: Jane van Dusen
- Scientific career
- Fields: Astronomy
- Workplaces: Lamont–Hussey Observatory

Richard Alfred Rossiter (December 19, 1886 – January 26, 1977) was an American astronomer known for the Rossiter–McLaughlin effect. Rossiter served as director of the Lamont–Hussey Observatory from 1928 until 1952.

== Early life ==
Rossiter was born in Oswego, New York, on December 19, 1886. He graduated from Wesleyan University in 1914, and married Jane van Dusen in 1915. He taught mathematics at Wesleyan Seminary for five years before enrolling in the astronomy program at the University of Michigan. He earned a master's degree in 1920, and a doctorate three years later. His doctoral dissertation, a study of the spectrum of Beta Lyrae, demonstrated that the shift that it exhibited could be accounted for by stellar rotation.

Rossiter and his wife had two children, Laura and Alfred.

== Career ==
In 1928 Rossiter became the first director of the Lamont–Hussey Observatory operated in South Africa by the University of Michigan. During this tenure at the observatory, he discovered more than 5,000 double stars. His Catalogue of Southern Double Stars, published in 1955, was dedicated to W. J. Hussey, one of the professors for whom the observatory was named.

== Published works ==
- New Southern Double Stars (first list) Found at the Lamont-Hussey Observatory of the University of Michigan at Bloemfontein, Royal Astronomical Society, 1933
- The orbit and rotation of the brighter component of Beta Lyrae, University of Michigan Press, Ann Arbor, Michigan, 1933
- Catalogue of Southern Double Stars (Publication of the Observatory of the University of Michigan, Volume XI), University of Michigan Press, Ann Arbor, Michigan, 1955

== Later life ==
Rossiter retired in Natal, South Africa in 1953, never returning to the U.S. He died at the age of 90 in Bloemfontein.
