= Kidnapping of Peggy McMath =

1933 child kidnapping in Massachusetts, United States

- Location: Harwich, Massachusetts
- Date: May 2, 1933
- Target: Peggy McMath
- Motive: Ransom
- Convictions: Kidnapping and extortion
- Convicted: Kenneth Buck
- Judge: Edward F. Hanify

On May 2, 1933, 10-year-old Peggy McMath, granddaughter of Detroit industrialist Francis Charles McMath, was kidnapped from a schoolhouse in Harwich, Massachusetts. She was returned for a ransom of $60,000. Her kidnapper, Kenneth Buck, was arrested, convicted, and served 16 years of a 25 year sentence. His brother, Cyril Buck, was also charged, but acquitted.

== Peggy McMath ==
Margaret Gray "Peggy" McMath was born on February 6, 1923 in Detroit. Her father, Neil Cook McMath, was the son of engineer and industrialist Francis Charles McMath and her mother, Margaret Kales, was the daughter of William R. Kales, president of Kales Stamping Company and vice president of Whitehead & Kales. Neil McMath had been a steel engineer in Detroit until the Great Depression. In 1931, the McMaths moved to the Kales family summer home in Harwich and Neil McMath started a yacht-building business.

== Kenneth Buck ==
Kenneth Earle Buck was born in Harwich in 1905. His father, Joshua Buck, was a sea captain who died from edema when Buck was 12. Buck was arrested at the age of 16 for "accessory before the larceny of an automobile tire" and received a number of speeding tickets throughout his life. He worked as an auto mechanic's assistant, mason's assistant, and private chauffeur, but was unable to find employment during the Depression. He had asked Neil McMath for a job several times, but had been rebuffed.

== Kidnapping ==
Needing money, Buck decided to kidnap a child for ransom. Neil McMath had two children, ten-year old Peggy and seven-year old Francis. Officials believed that Peggy was targeted because her school had a telephone and Francis' did not.

On May 2, 1933, Buck used burnt cork to disguise himself in blackface. Around 2:30 pm, he used the pay phone at a general store in Chatham, Massachusetts to make two phone calls. Posing as Neil McMath, he called the Harwich Center School, asking that Peggy be released early to a chauffeur. He then called the McMath residence posing as a telephone repairman asking that the phone be disconnected for ten minutes so that the line could be repaired. A few minutes later, Buck drove to the school and asked Jack Shaughnessey, a ten-year old student, to tell McMath's teacher to send her out. Buck told McMath that her mother had sent him to pick her up. When she hesitated, he grabbed her and told her to “shut up”. He drove to a wooded road, where he bound and gagged McMath and placed her in the back seat. He then drove to a shack at the edge of a cranberry bog near a golf course, where he left McMath.

McMath’s disappearance was reported around 3:30 pm, when she failed to get off the school bus. Descriptions of McMath and Buck were given to every police department in the state as well as to highway patrol officers in New England and New York, United States Customs Service and Bureau of Immigration officers at the Canada–United States border, and every United States Coast Guard vessel on the east coast. The Detroit Police Department was asked to investigate the possible involvement of The Purple Gang.

Around 7 p.m., Buck asked his neighbor, Walter Cahoon, to play a game of golf. During the game, Buck stated that he was involved with a rum-running operation that had kidnapped Peggy McMath.

Around 11 p.m., Buck moved McMath from the shack to a crawl space under an unoccupied house across the street from his. He removed her gag and instructed her not to speak or he would hurt her parents.

On May 3, Neil McMath delivered an appeal over the radio asking for his daughter’s return. He promised to pay a ransom and not involve the police. Later that day, Buck's older brother, Cyril, got in touch with Neil McMath. He took Peggy's lunch box along with a handwritten note as a proof of life, and demanded $250,000. McMath told him he would be unable to pay this much and the two later agreed on a smaller sum – $70,000.

The money was delivered from Merchants National Bank of Boston to Harwich by vice president, George Bacon. Bacon requested an armed guard from the Massachusetts State Police, which led law enforcement to deduce that McMath was ready to pay a ransom. Meanwhile, Kenneth Buck had told his neighbors that he had landed a new job and planned to leave town.

== Return ==
On May 5, 1933, Peggy was returned to her father by Cyril and Kenneth Buck. Cyril, Peggy, Neil, and William Lee, a friend and business partner of Neil McMath, then boarded Lee's houseboat, The Bob, where the four planned to wait for 48 hours to allow Kenneth time to leave town. By noon, the State Police had received word that McMath had been returned and public safety commissioner Daniel Needham requested the United States Coast Guard board The Bob. Cyril Buck was arrested and gave up his brother. Upon his arrest, Kenneth made a full confession and all of the money was recovered.

== Legal proceedings ==
Kenneth Buck was charged with kidnapping and Cyril Buck was charged with extortion. Neil McMath expressed sympathy for Cyril, hoping that the criminal justice system would "deal with him lightly, perhaps exonerate him" because he had "brought my child back to me alive and unharmed". Conversely, he hoped that Kenneth would receive a "very severe sentence".

On June 24, 1933, Kenneth Buck was found guilty and sentence to 24 to 25 years in prison. Cyril was acquitted of kidnapping and extortion. Buck attempted to have his confession thrown out and appealed his case, unsuccessfully, to the Massachusetts Supreme Judicial Court. He sought to be released to serve in the armed forces during World War II, but was denied. In 1947, Neil McMath joined an appeal to reduce Buck's sentence. He was paroled on June 23, 1949.

== See also ==
- List of kidnappings (1930–1939)
