= De Volson Wood =

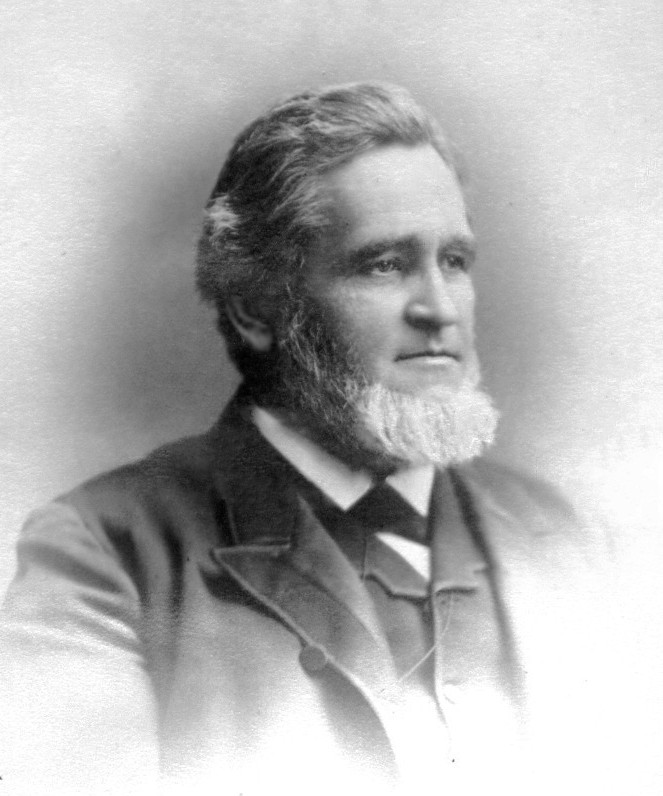
- Born: June 1, 1832; Smyrna, New York, US
- Died: June 27, 1897 (aged 65); Hoboken, New Jersey, US
- Education: Rensselaer Polytechnic Institute
- Scientific career
- Fields: Civil engineering

De Volson Wood (June 1, 1832 – June 27, 1897) was an American civil engineer and educator. He invented a steam rock drill and an air compressor and designed an ore dock. Wood was a professor, an author of multiple monographs on mathematics and engineering, vice-president of the American Association for the Advancement of Science and the first president of the American Society for Engineering Education.

== Biography ==
De Volson Wood, son of Julius and Amanda (Billings) Wood, was born near Smyrna, New York. He studied in a public school, with an additional six weeks in a private academy and two terms in Cazenovia Seminary. In 1849 he began teaching, with which he was occupied until his death, his subsequent education being received while he was himself instructing. He started at Smyrna where he taught for three terms. Desiring to continue his education, he then went to the Albany State Normal School and graduated in 1853. He then obtained his first position as principal, in the Napanoch School, Ulster County, New York. Returning to the closing exercises of the Albany Normal School during a week of vacation, Wood accepted an offer of assistant professorship in mathematics.

In 1855, Wood went to study at the Rensselaer Polytechnic Institute, Troy, New York, but still did not give up teaching, as the Preparatory Department of the Institute was being organized at that time, and he was asked to teach mathematics there. On graduating with the degree of civil engineer, Wood went west, hoping to obtain a position in Chicago. He stopped for a few days at Detroit and went to see the University of Michigan buildings at Ann Arbor. In a chat after hearing a lecture by President Tappan, Wood was offered professorship in civil engineering, which he accepted and carried for fifteen years. During those years, he received honorary degrees of AM and MSc from Hamilton College and the University of Michigan (1859), respectively. He also organized the Department of Civil Engineering.

Wood was married in September 1859 to Cordera E. Crane, who died in June 1866 leaving one child. In August 1868, he married Fannie M. Hartson, by whom he had six children.

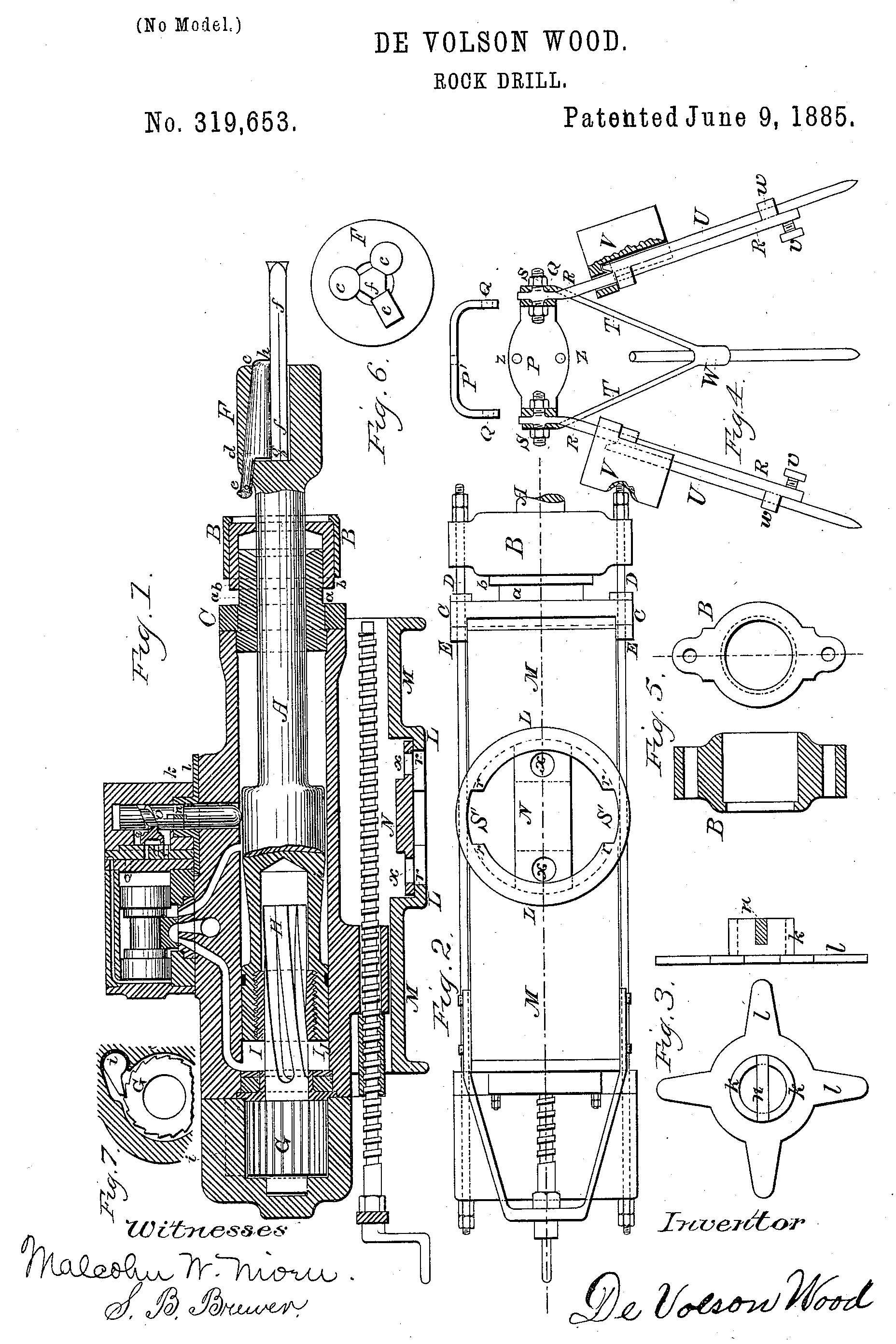
Drawing from the Wood's rock drill patent

Wood was a member of the American Society of Civil Engineers from 1871 to 1885, and a member of the American Association for the Advancement of Science (AAAS) from 1879 to his death. He became vice-president of AAAS in 1885. He was also a member of the American Mathematical Society, an honorary member of the American Society of Architects, a member of the American Society of Mechanical Engineers and the first president of the American Society for Engineering Education (1893–1894). He invented the "Wood's Steam Rock-Drill" and various other devices and published several dozen books and articles in scientific journals on mathematics, engineering and thermodynamics. His major works include the following:

- A treatise on the resistance of materials, and an appendix on the preservation of timber. J. Wiley & Son. 1871.
- "Trussed Bridges and Roofs." 250 pp. New York, 1872.
- Revision of " Mahan's Civil Engineering." 589 pp. New York, 1873.
- American edition of " Magnus's Lessons on Elementary Mechanics." 312 pp. London and New York, 1876.
- "Foundations." Johnson's Encyclopaedia. New York, 1875.
- Treatise on the theory of the construction of bridges and roofs. J. Wiley. 1876.
- "Dynamics." Appleton's Cyclopaedia of Applied Mechanics. New York, 1879.
- The principles of elementary mechanics. John Wiley & Sons. 1877.
- The elements of coordinate geometry: in three parts: 1. Cartesian geometry; 2. Quaternions; 3. Modern geometry, and an appendix. J. Wiley. 1882.
- Key and supplement to Elementary mechanics (PDF). J. Wiley & Sons. 1882.
- The elements of analytical mechanics: solids and fluids. J. Wiley. 1884.
- The luminiferous æther. D. Van Nostrand. 1886.
- Trigonometry, analytical, plane and spherical, with logarithmic tables. J.Wiley. 1887.
- Thermodynamics. Burr Printing House. 1888.
- Thermodynamics, heat motors, and refrigerating machines. J. Wiley. 1889.
- "Technical Education in America." American Supplement to Encyclopædia Britannica, 1897.
