= Bentley Historical Library =

Library at the University of Michigan

Coordinates: 42°17′21.93″N 83°42′44.84″W

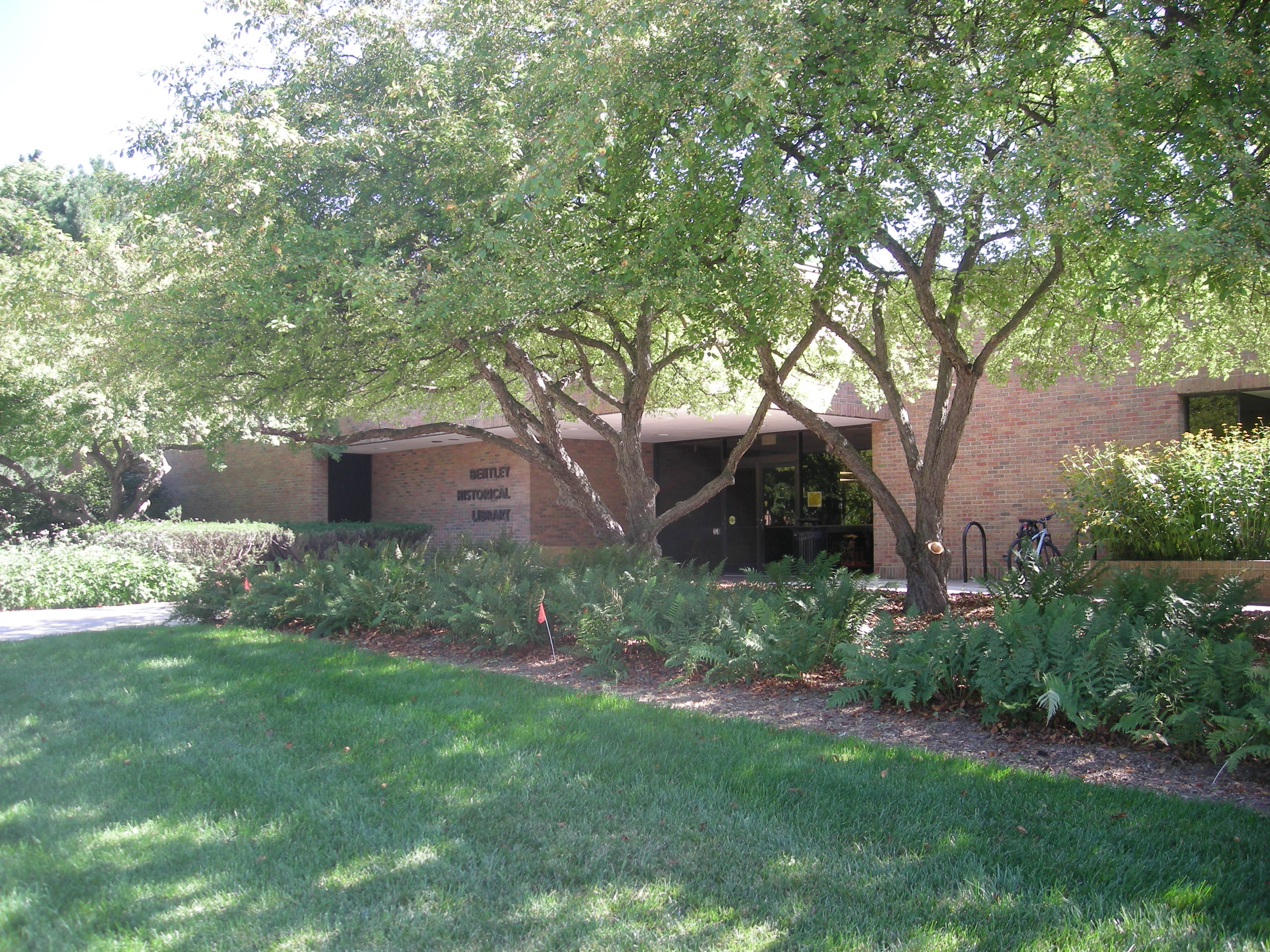
Bentley Historical Library

The Bentley Historical Library is the campus archive for the University of Michigan and is located on the University of Michigan's North Campus in Ann Arbor. It was established in 1935 by the regents of the University of Michigan. Its mission is to serve as the official archives of the university and to document the history of the state of Michigan, as well as the activities of its people, organizations and voluntary associations. It is open to the public and free to use.

The library is named after Alvin M. Bentley, a former regent and U.S. Congressman, whose widow, Arvella D. Bentley, endowed the library. The Judy and Stanley Frankel Detroit Observatory, located on the university's Central Campus, is a division of the Bentley Historical Library.

== Collection ==
The Bentley Historical Library holds over 12,000 collections within its three facilities. Many of the collections are made up of materials created by or about various individuals, groups, or organizations associated with the state of Michigan or the University of Michigan. Topics focused on the University of Michigan include past administrative activities, campus buildings, student life, and involvement in events such as the Polar Bear Expedition and World War II. In addition to paper materials, the collections also contain materials in other formats such as photographs, sound recordings, videotapes, and oral histories.

The library also has materials that are available to view online, including:

- Digital copies of items from some of the physical collections
- Resources such as the library's African American Student Project and the university's Athletics History
- Online exhibits on topics like the admission of women into the university
- Digital collections including the Detroit Jewish News Archives, the Bentley Image Bank, and the Web Archive

The Bentley Image Bank is a selection of photographs from various collections in the library that have been digitized and are available to view online. The Web Archive preserves websites related to Michigan or to the University of Michigan.
