= McMath (crater) =

Crater on the Moon's far side

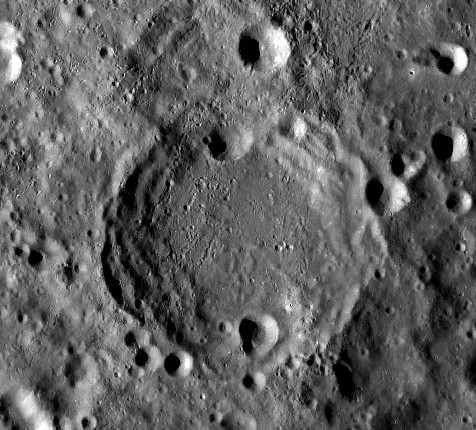
- LRO WAC image
- Coordinates: 16.63°N 166.09°W
- Diameter: 88.58 km (55.04 mi)
- Depth: unknown
- Colongitude: 167° at sunrise
- Eponym: Francis C. McMath; Robert R. McMath

McMath is an impact crater on the Moon's far side. It lies to the south-southwest of the prominent crater Jackson, and material from the ray system centered on Jackson lies across most of McMath. Farther to the south lies the crater pair of Zhukovskiy and Lebedinskiy. McMath lies to the northwest of the Dirichlet-Jackson Basin.

This is an eroded crater with several small craters along the rim edge. The rim is the most heavily worn at the northern end, but is more intact to the east and west. The interior floor is relatively level.

Prior to formal naming in 1970 by the IAU, this crater was known as Crater 230.

== Satellite craters ==
By convention these features are identified on lunar maps by placing the letter on the side of the crater midpoint that is closest to McMath.

McMath	Latitude	Longitude	Diameter
A	19.2° N	165.3° W	15 km
J	14.8° N	163.3° W	36 km
M	16.1° N	165.5° W	15 km
P	13.4° N	168.6° W	28 km
Q	14.5° N	167.7° W	20 km

== See also ==
- 1955 McMath, minor planet
