= Nelson Bohnalite =

Piston developed by Adolph Lincoln Nelson

Nelson-Bohnalite was the name of a piston developed by Adolph Lincoln Nelson in the 1930s and 1940s. The pistons were licensed to Bohn Aluminum and sold to all the major auto manufacturers at the time. These were some of the first pistons to use an aluminum body with a steel strut, allowing for the weight of aluminum and the strength of steel where the piston moves on the piston rod. Many then existing brands of autos used this type of piston in the mid-1930s: Auburn, Graham, Hupmobile, Nash, Packard, Pierce-Arrow and Studebaker.
