= W. Albert Hiltner =

American astronomer (1914–1991)

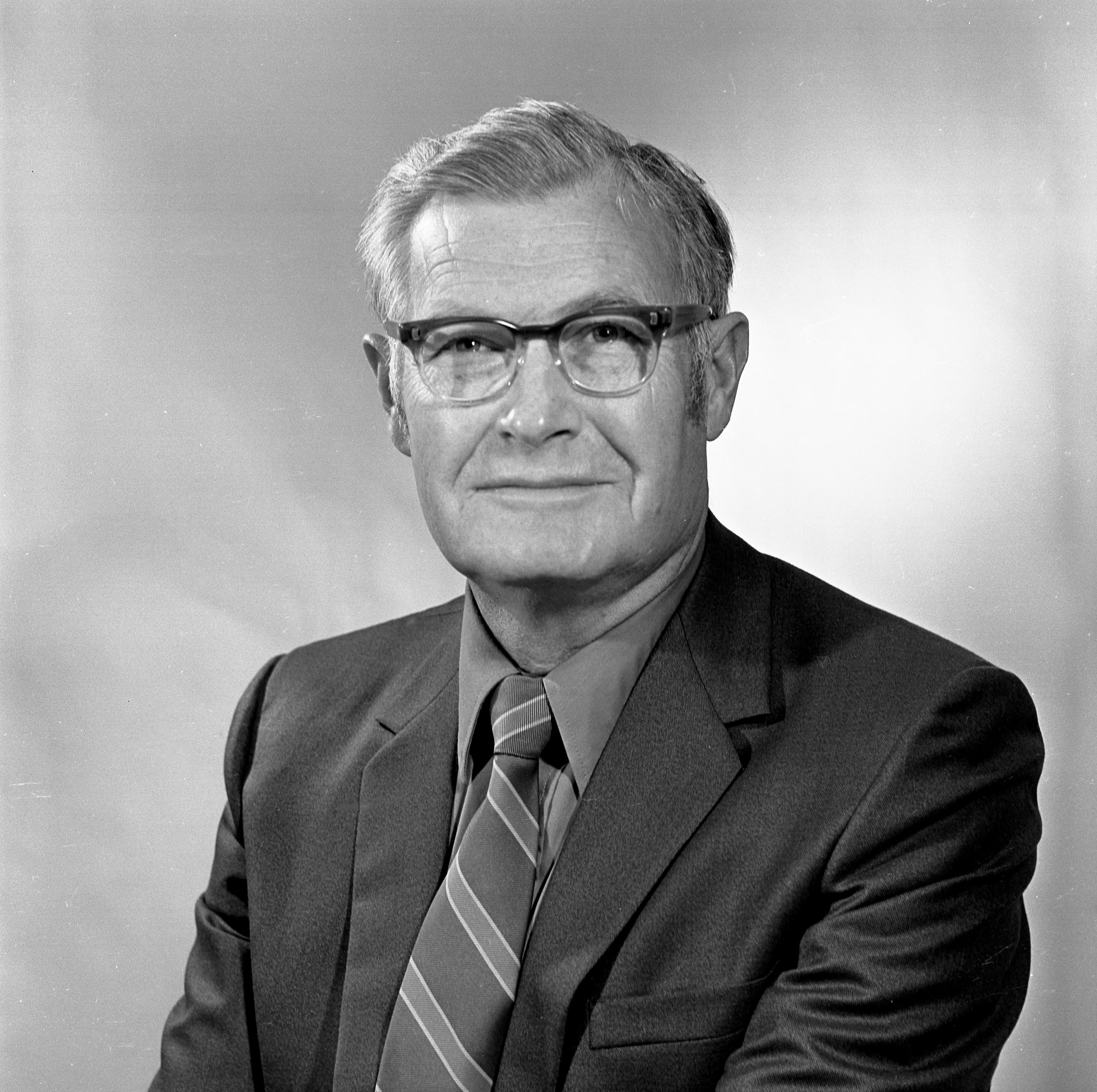
- Hiltner in 1970
- Born: 27 August 1914; North Creek
- Died: 30 September 1991
- Education: University of Michigan, University of Toledo
- Occupations: Astronomer; university teacher
- Employers: University of Michigan (1970–); Yerkes Observatory (1943–)

William Albert Hiltner (27 August 1914 – 30 September 1991) was an American astronomer, noted for his work leading up to the discovery of interstellar polarization. He was an early practitioner of precision stellar photometry, and a pioneering observer of the optical counterparts of celestial x-ray sources.

Hiltner was director of Yerkes Observatory for many years, while there he designed and built a rotatable telescope for polarization studies and developed photometric instrumentation. He was the acting director of the Cerro Tololo Interamerican Observatory, then president of the Associated Universities for Research in Astronomy from 1968 until 1971. He was appointed Director of the University of Michigan Detroit Observatory in 1970, a post he held until 1982. He established MDM Observatory and led the construction of the Hiltner Telescope, which is named for him.

After retiring from his professorship at University of Michigan, he joined the staff of the Carnegie Observatories to become the Project Manager for the Magellan Telescope Project, a program to build two 6.5 meter telescopes on Las Campanas in Chile.

== Education ==
His undergrad was at the University of Toledo and his graduate studies were at the University of Michigan culminating in a doctorate in astrophysics in 1942.

== Personal life ==
Hiltner was born on the farm of his parents, John Nicholas and Ida Lavina (née Schafer) Hiltner, in North Creek, Ohio, 45 miles southwest of Toledo. The youngest of four siblings, he received his early education in a one room schoolhouse. Gaining an interest in astronomy at an early age, he graduated from high school in a class of 17, and entered the University of Toledo the following year.

During his graduate studies at University of Michigan in Ann Arbor, he married Ruth Kreider, daughter of Henry Royer Kreider, a chemist and minister who founded the chemistry department at the University of Toledo. They had four children. Anne Hiltner was a polymer chemist at Case Western Reserve. Kathryn Mook became a professional handweaver and hospital administrator. William A. Hiltner, Jr. became a carpenter and architect. Stephen K. Hiltner is a jazz musician and composer, and founded the nonprofit Ellerbe Creek Watershed Association and Friends of Herrontown Woods.

== Awards and honors ==
Asteroid 4924 Hiltner, discovered by astronomer Schelte J. Bus in 1981, was named in his memory. The official naming citation was published by the Minor Planet Center on 16 May 1992 (M.P.C. 20162).
