= Angell Hall =

Academic building at the University of Michigan

James Burrill Angell Hall
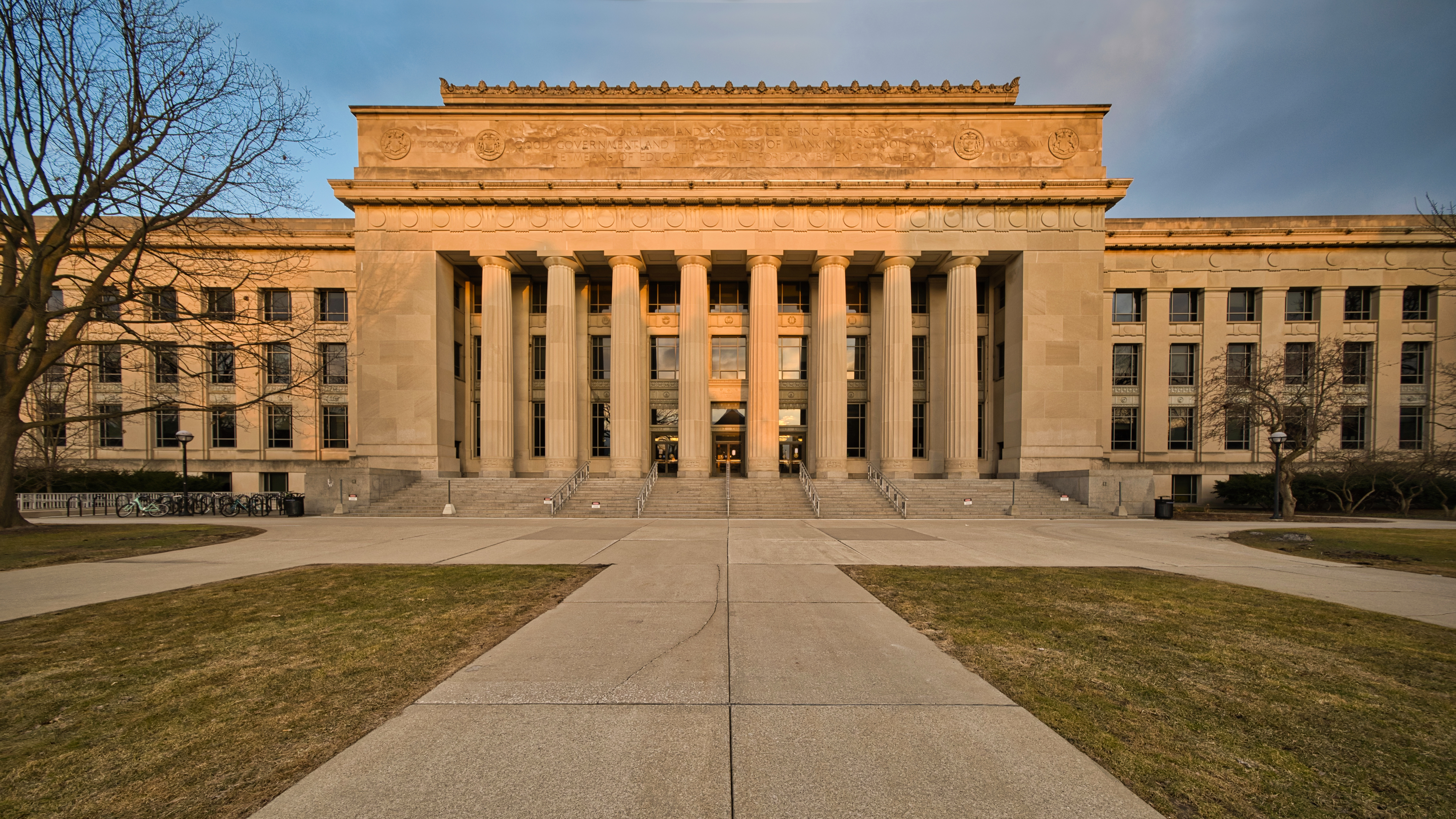
- Interactive map of the James Burrill Angell Hall area

General information
- Location: Ann Arbor, Michigan, United States, 435 S. State
- Coordinates: 42°16′36.3″N 83°44′23.7″W
- Groundbreaking: 1920
- Completed: 1924
- Cost: $1 million (1924)
- Owner: University of Michigan

Technical details
- Floor count: 4
- Floor area: 152,000 square feet

Design and construction
- Architect: Albert Kahn

Angell Hall is an academic building at the University of Michigan in Ann Arbor, United States. It was previously connected to the University Hall building, which was replaced by Mason Hall and Haven Hall. Angell Hall is named in honor of James Burrill Angell, who was the University's president from 1871 to 1909. Mason Hall is named after Stevens T. Mason, the first governor of Michigan, while Haven Hall was named for the university's second president, Erastus O. Haven. Tisch Hall, named for donors Preston and Joan Tisch, is also connected to Angell Hall.

The Angell Hall Observatory is located on the fifth floor roof of Angell Hall. The main telescope is a 0.4-m (16-inch) Ritchey-Chretien reflector, which has a spectrograph and camera. The observatory also has a small radio telescope and 20-cm (8-inch) Schmidt-Cassegrains.

== History ==
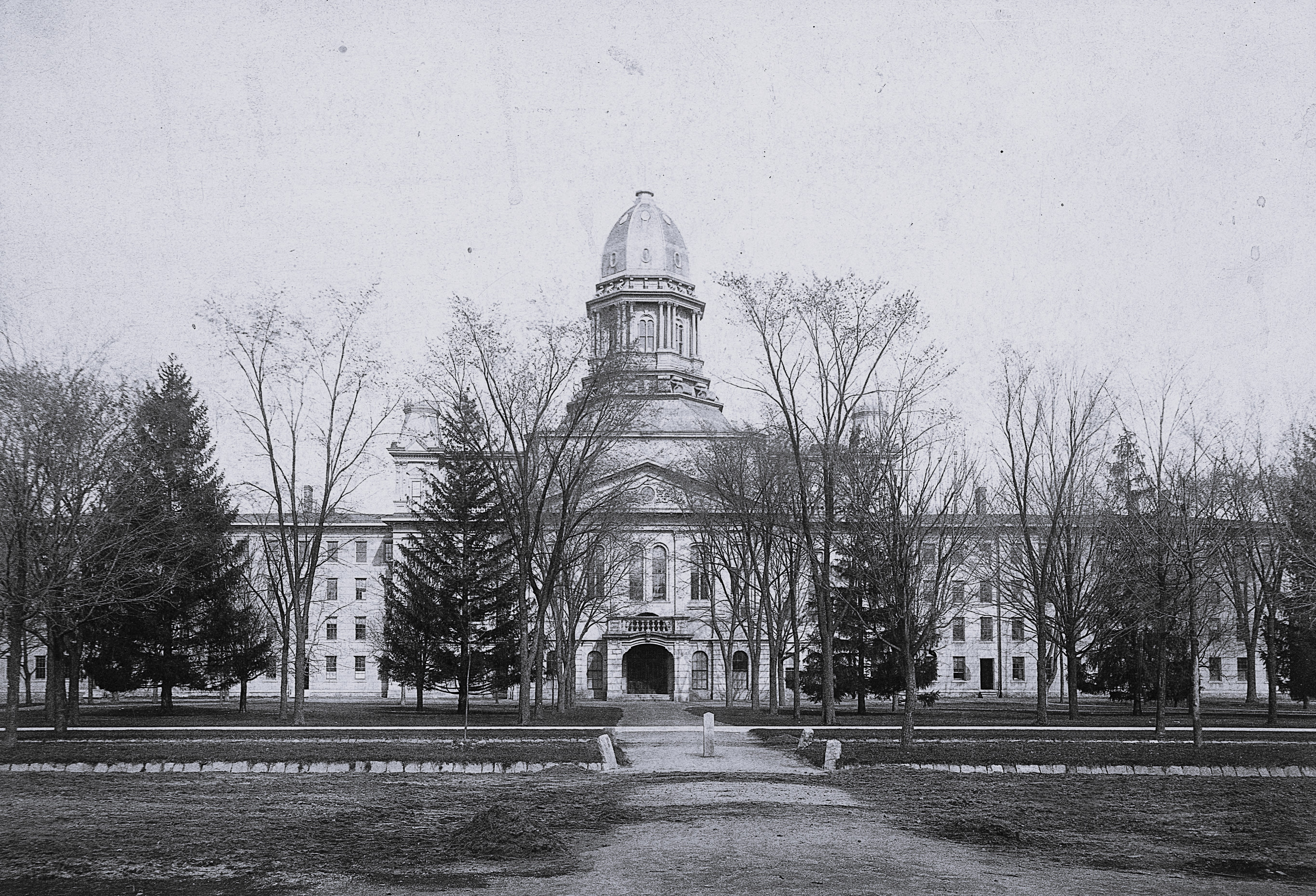
University Hall (1872-1896), located partly on the grounds of present-day Angell Hall

Construction began in 1920, and finished in 1924 at a cost of about $1 million. An addition opened in 1952 adding auditoriums, a classroom wing, and an office wing. The addition replaced old Haven Hall, which was destroyed by fire in 1950, the 1841 Mason Hall, and two other buildings.

On March 24, 1965, Angell Hall was the site of the first teach-in protesting the Vietnam War. More than 3,000 people attended the all-night program of seminars, rallies and speeches held in response to the recent escalation of American involvement in the conflict.

On November 16, 2016, a student-led march and rally throughout several University of Michigan campus buildings concluded on the front steps of Angell Hall. The march was organized in response to increased racial tensions at the university, including incidents of racism, islamophobia, and racial violence. Reverend Jesse Jackson spoke to the crowd of thousands at the beginning of the rally on the steps of Hatcher Graduate Library, inciting a call to action to speak out against racism and hate.

== Design ==
The building's exterior, particularly the Doric columns, was intended to match that of campus other buildings at the time, including Hill Auditorium, Alumni Memorial Hall, and the Clements Library.

The entrance lobby was finished in travertine marble.

On the front facade, the carving reads, "Religion, morality, and knowledge, being necessary to good government and the happiness of mankind, schools and the means of education shall forever be encouraged." The text is taken from the Northwest Ordinance of 1787.
