= Francis Charles McMath =

American civil engineer and amateur astronomer

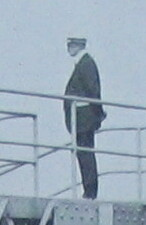
Francis McMath on the Quebec Bridge, 1918

Francis Charles McMath (1867 – February 13, 1938) was an American civil engineer and amateur astronomer.

He became successful in the bridge-building industry, and was president of the Canadian Bridge and Iron Company in Detroit. (Detroit Bridge & Iron Works.) His sons were named Robert Raynolds McMath and Neil Cook.

== Astronomy ==
He had a strong interest in amateur astronomy, and, along with his son Robert, began an ambitious program of observatory development. They collaborated with Judge Henry S. Hulbert from Wayne County, Michigan to construct The McMath-Hulbert Observatory by Lake Angelus near Pontiac, Michigan. They began collaborating with the University of Michigan, and in 1931 the director suggested naming the site the McMath-Hulbert Observatory in honor of the founders. Robert would become a solar astronomer.

In 1932 the McMath's and Judge Hulbert devised an innovative technique of taking multiple still images of the Sun, Moon, planets and stars, then combining them into a movie.

== Personal life and awards ==
In May, 1933, McMath's 10-year-old granddaughter Peggy McMath was kidnapped from her Massachusetts schoolhouse by brothers Kenneth and Cyril Buck, but successfully returned for a ransom of $60,000. Also in 1933, he and his son were awarded the Franklin Institute's John Price Wetherill Medal.

== Legacy ==
Following his death a 24" Cassegrain reflector telescope added to the McMath-Hulbert Observatory was named the F. C. McMath Memorial Telescope. The crater McMath on the Moon is co-named for Francis and his son Robert. A gift to the Union College, located in Schenectady, New York, endowed a summer research fellowship in 1946 in Civil Engineering in his name.

The McMath–Pierce solar telescope (the McMath Solar Telescope from 1962 to 1992) at Kitt Peak National Observatory in Arizona is named after McMath's son Robert Raynolds McMath.
