= MDM Observatory =

Observatory in Pima County, Arizona

Michigan-Dartmouth-MIT Observatory
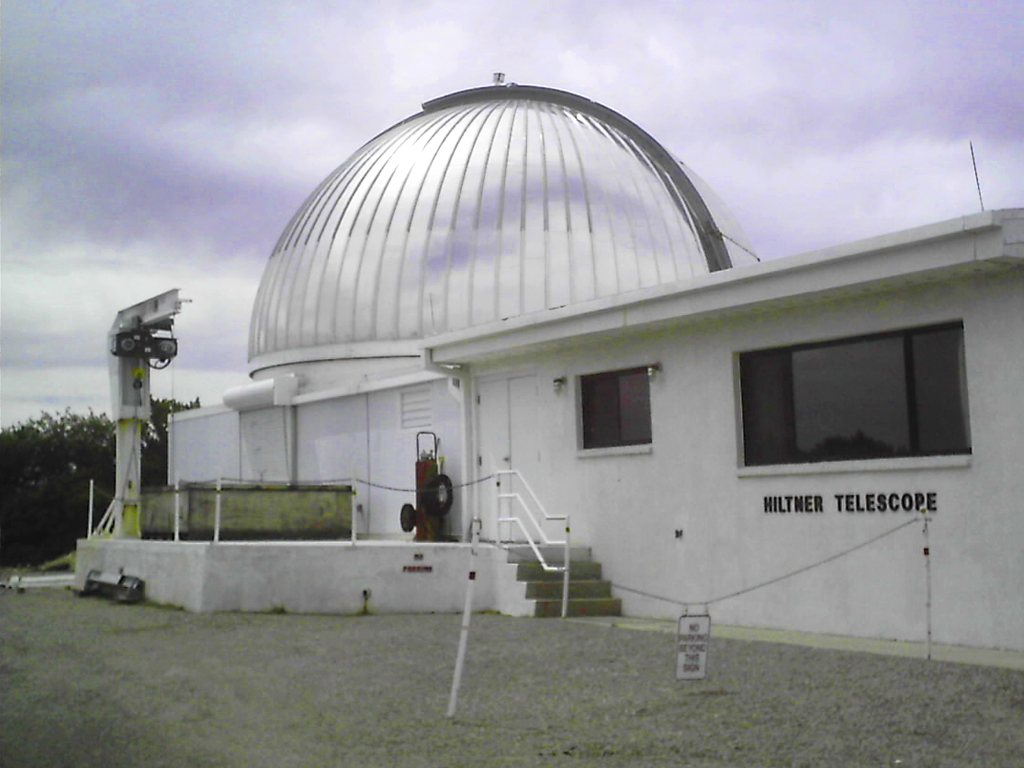
- MDM Hiltner 2.4 m Telescope
- Alternative names: MDM Observatory
- Organization: Columbia University; Dartmouth College; Ohio State University; Ohio University; University of Michigan
- Observatory code: 697
- Location: Kitt Peak, Arizona, US
- Coordinates: 31°57′06″N 111°36′58″W
- Telescopes: Hiltner 2.4m Telescope; McGraw-Hill Telescope
- Location of MDM Observatory
- Related media on Commons

The MDM Observatory (Michigan-Dartmouth-MIT Observatory; obs. code: 697) is an optical astronomical observatory located adjacent to Kitt Peak National Observatory on Kitt Peak, west of Tucson, Arizona, in the United States. It is owned and operated by the University of Michigan, Dartmouth College, Ohio State University, Columbia University, and Ohio University. The Massachusetts Institute of Technology (MIT) was also part of the operating consortium in the past.

It has two reflecting telescopes, the 2.4-meter (95 inches aperture Hiltner Telescope (since 1986), used for galactic surveys, and the 1.3-meter (50 inch diameter aperture) McGraw–Hill Telescope (since 1975), which was originally located near Ann Arbor, Michigan.

== Hiltner Telescope ==
The mirror of the 2.4-meter Hiltner Telescope is aluminum-coated Cer-Vit, and usable foci include f/7.5 and f/13.5 Cassegrain foci. The telescope was built in 1986 and the mirrors were re-polished in 1991. It was named after astronomer W. Albert Hiltner (1914-1991).

The Hiltner was one of the telescopes that observed the "turn on" transient of a galactic nucleus, along with the Swift space telescope (aka Neil Gehrels Swift Observatory since 2018) and the Gemini observatory (8 meter ground observatory). The transient event was called PS1-13cbe and was located in the Galaxy SDSS J222153.87+003054.2.

== McGraw–Hill Telescope ==
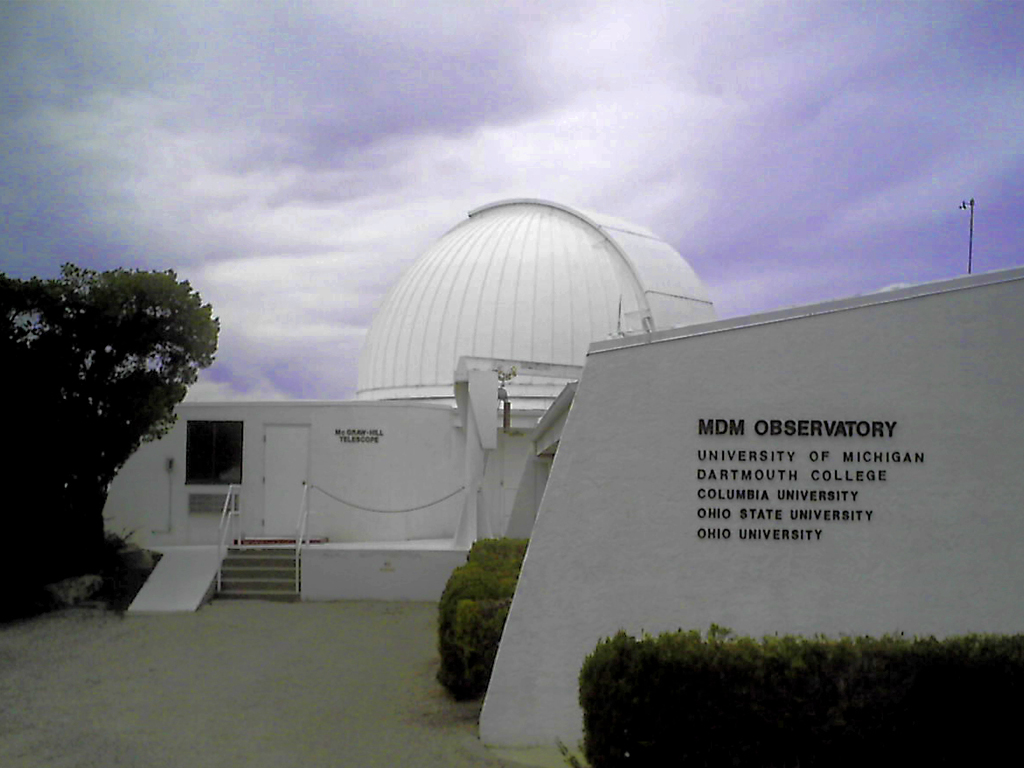
MDM McGraw-Hill 1.3 m Telescope

The 1.3-meter McGraw-Hill Telescope, with a 1.27-meter clear aperture, is an aluminum-coated Cer-Vit (low thermal expansion glass) telescope. Its usable foci include f/7.5 and f/13.5. The telescope was originally installed at Stinchfield Woods, Michigan in 1969, and moved in 1975 to MDM.

=== Asteroid 4432 McGraw-Hill ===
The asteroid 4432 McGraw-Hill is named after this telescope. It was discovered on March 2, 1981 by Schelte J. Bus at Siding Spring in the course of the UK Schmidt-Caltech Asteroid Survey. On February 18, 1992, the International Astronomical Union officially assigned the name "McGraw-Hill" to the asteroid. The text of the citation, as officially published by IAU Commission 20 (M.P.C. 19697), is as follows:

Named after the 1.3 m McGraw-Hill telescope located on the southwestern ridge of Kitt Peak, Arizona, which was the site for the first physical observations for this minor planet. The telescope is operated by a consortium comprising the University of Michigan, Dartmouth College, and the Massachusetts Institute of Technology. Originally erected at Stinchfield Woods near Dexter, Michigan, in July 1969, the telescope was moved to its current location in 1975 through the generous financial support of McGraw-Hill Incorporated and the Sloan Foundation. Name proposed and citation provided by Richard P. Binzel.

== Gallery ==
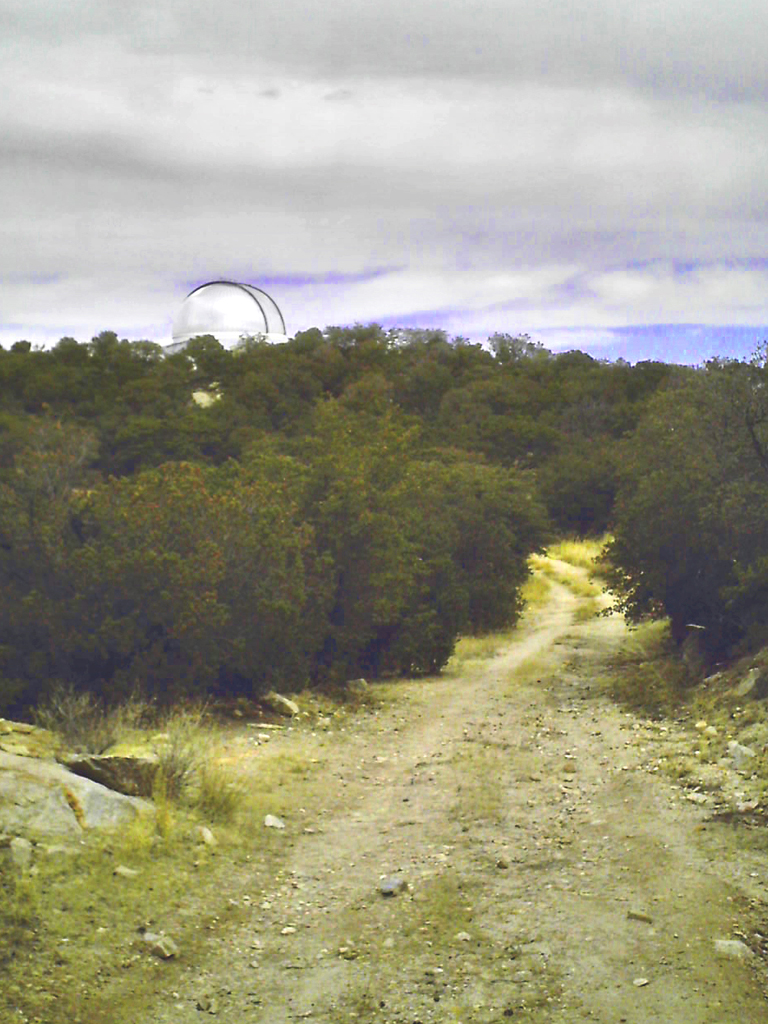
View from the Point

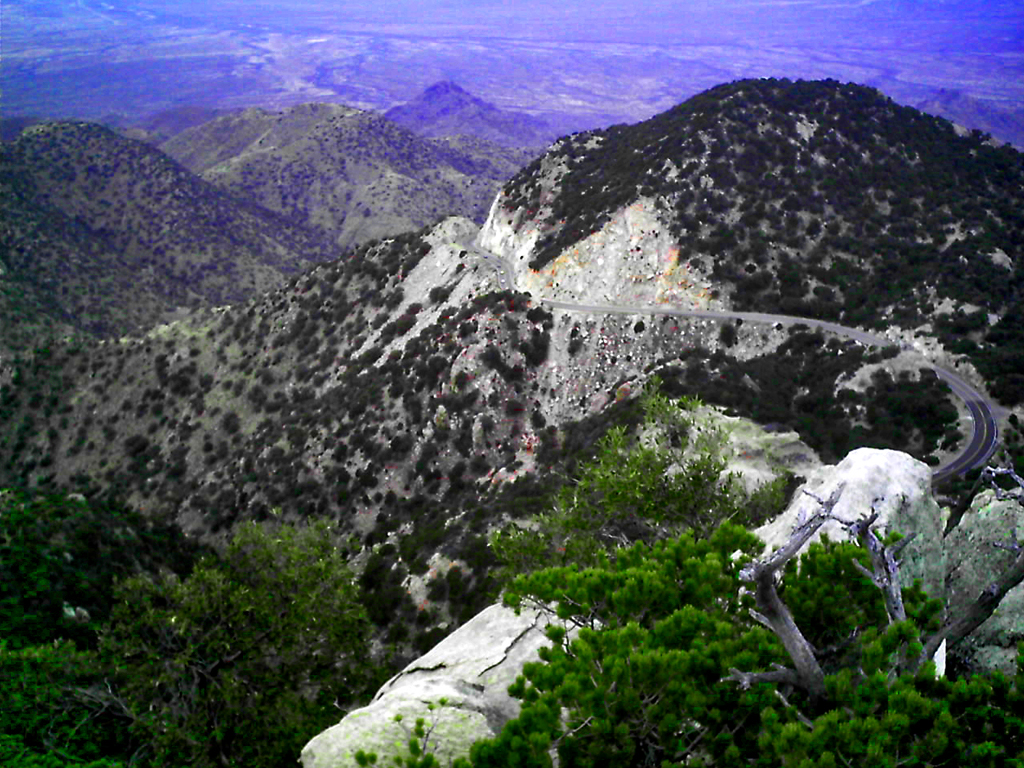
View down Kitt Peak from MDM

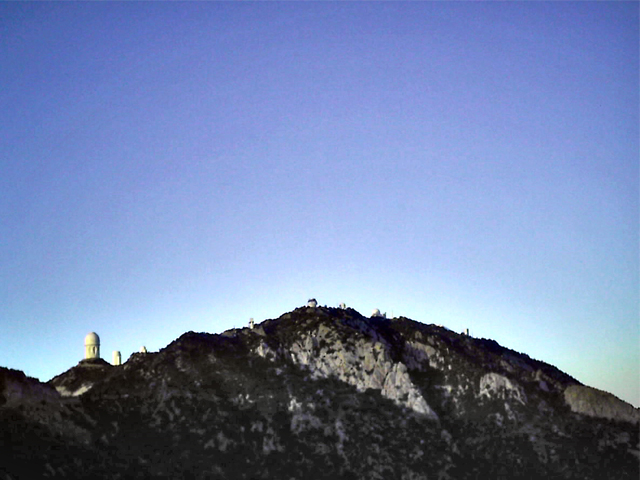
View up Kitt Peak from MDM

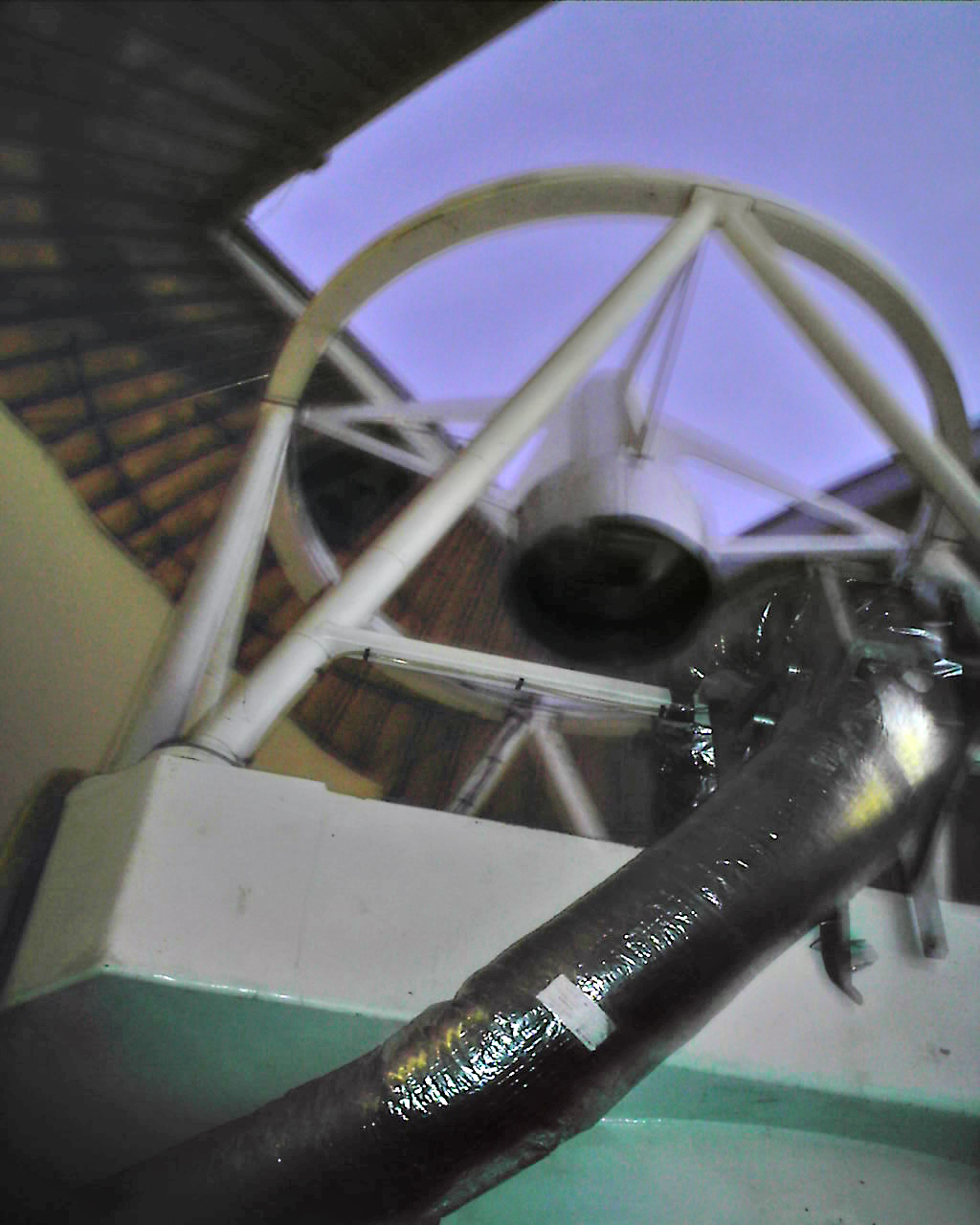
Opening the Dome

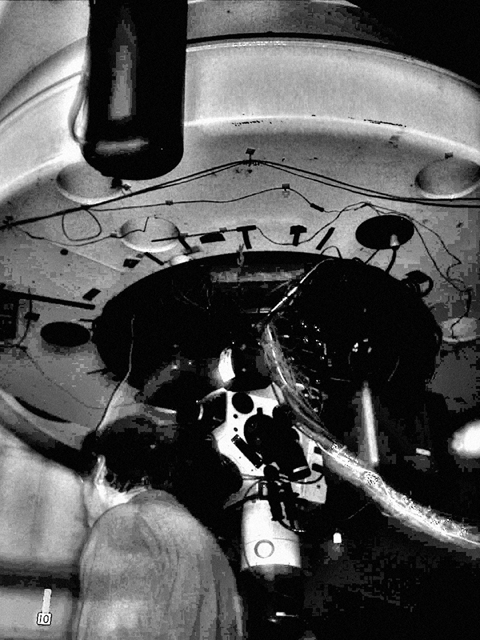
Instruments

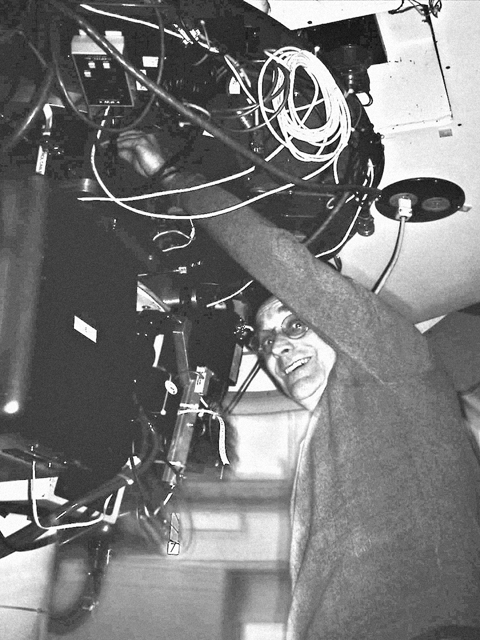
Instruments

== See also ==
- List of largest optical telescopes in the 20th century
- List of observatories
