= McMath–Hulbert Observatory =

Observatory in Michigan, US

- Location: Lake Angelus, Michigan, USA
- Coordinates: 42.697648°N 83.319175°W
- Established: 1929
- Website: www.mcmathhulbert.org

The McMath-Hulbert Solar Observatory is a solar observatory in Lake Angelus, Michigan, USA. It was established in 1929 as a private observatory by father and son Francis Charles McMath and Robert Raynolds McMath and their friend, Judge Henry Hulbert. In 1932 the observatory was deeded to the University of Michigan which operated it until 1981, at which time it was sold into private ownership again.

In 1932 a 10.5-inch (270 mm) reflector telescope was added to the observatory as well as a spectroheliokinematograph {spectro-helio-kine-mato-graph}. This instrument was designed to take motion pictures of the Sun. The McMath-Hulbert Solar Observatory is primarily known for the motion pictures that the McMaths made of various celestial phenomena, including the first movies of solar prominences in motion. Later work involved solar spectroscopy in the near infrared and participation in a solar flare patrol program in the 1950s.

Robert McMath and one of the resident astronomers, Keith Pierce, established the McMath–Pierce solar telescope at Kitt Peak Observatory near Tucson, Arizona in 1962.

The McMath-Hulbert Solar Observatory is currently under private ownership but is run by a small non-for-profit organization of amateur astronomers.

== See also ==
- Angell Hall Observatory
- List of astronomical observatories
- Observatory
- Solar Telescope
