= Lake Angelus, Michigan =

- City
- City of Lake Angelus
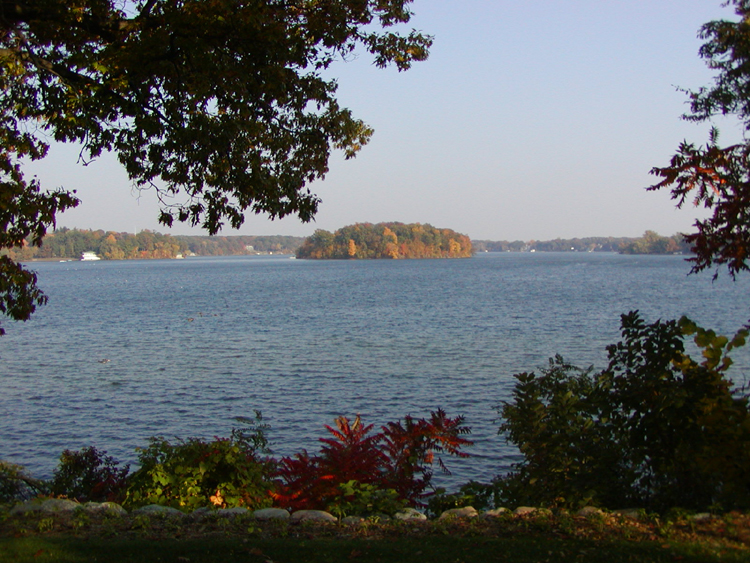
- View of Lake Angelus

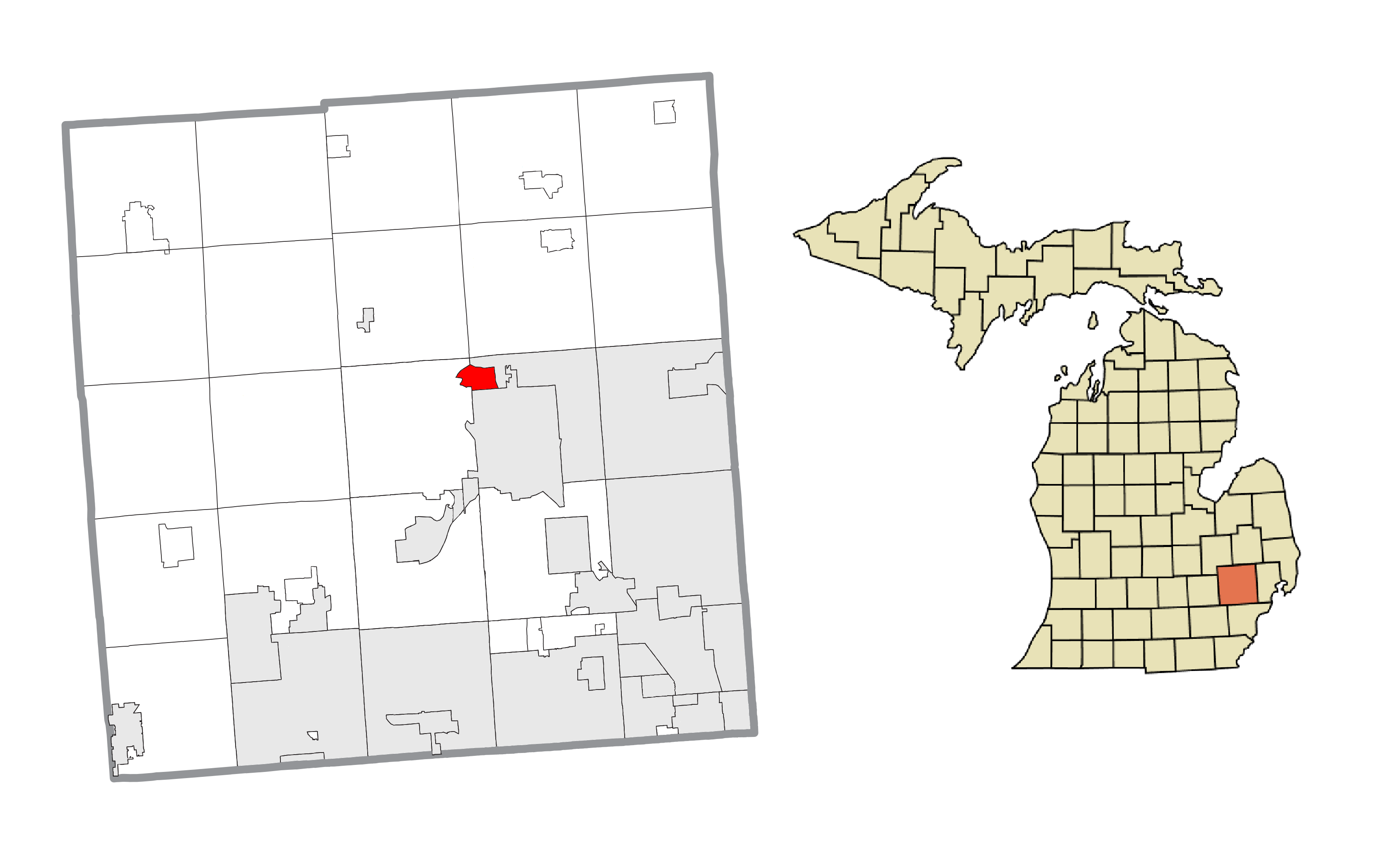
- Location within Oakland County

- Location within the state of Michigan
- Coordinates: 42°41′31″N 83°19′32″W
- Country: United States
- State: Michigan
- County: Oakland
- Incorporated: 1929 (village); 1984 (city)

Government
  - Mayor: Lee McNew

Area
  - City: 1.62 sq mi (4.20 km^{2})
  - Land: 0.98 sq mi (2.55 km^{2})
  - Water: 0.63 sq mi (1.64 km^{2}) 34.36%
- Elevation: 980 ft (300 m)

Population (2020)
  - City: 287
  - Density: 291.3/sq mi (112.48/km^{2})
  - Metro: 4,296,250 (Metro Detroit)
- Time zone: UTC-5 (EST)
  - Summer (DST): UTC-4 (EDT)
- ZIP code(s): 48326 (Auburn Hills)
- Area code: 248
- FIPS code: 26-44440
- GNIS feature ID: 0629962
- Website: Official website

Lake Angelus is a city in Oakland County in the U.S. state of Michigan. An affluent northern suburb of Detroit, Lake Angelus is located about 35 miles (56 km) north of downtown Detroit. With a population of 287 as of the 2020 census, Lake Angelus is the second-smallest city in Michigan, behind Omer; it also has one of the highest per capita incomes of any community in the state.

== History ==
In the early 1900s, a small community formed around the lake, then called Three Mile Lake. During the 1920s, the lake was renamed Lake Angelus by Mrs. Sollace B. Collidge as the original name stood for the distance from the eastern side of the lake shore to the western shore. The community was under pressure from nearby government establishments to be annexed. In 1929, however, a special state act of legislation was passed, granting Lake Angelus incorporation as a village. Lake Angelus became a city of its own in 1984.

== Geography ==
According to the United States Census Bureau, the city has a total area of 1.63 square miles (4.22 km^{2}), of which 1.07 square miles (2.77 km^{2}) is land and 0.56 square miles (1.45 km^{2}) (34.36%) is water.

The city completely surrounds the lake of the same name. The city is bordered:

- To the north and east by the city of Auburn Hills
- To the south by the city of Pontiac
- To the west by Waterford Township

== Government ==
=== Federal, state, and county legislators ===
United States House of Representatives
| District | Representative | Party | Since |
|---|---|---|---|
| 11th | Haley Stevens | Democratic | 2019 |

Michigan Senate
| District | Senator | Party | Since |
|---|---|---|---|
| 7th | Jeremy Moss | Democratic | 2023 |

Michigan House of Representatives
| District | Representative | Party | Since |
|---|---|---|---|
| 52nd | Mike Harris | Republican | 2022 |

Oakland County Board of Commissioners
| District | Commissioner | Party | Since |
|---|---|---|---|
| 8 | Karen Joliat | Republican | 2021 |

== Demographics ==
Historical population
| Census | Pop. | Note | %± |
|---|---|---|---|
| 1930 | 27 | | — |
| 1940 | 139 | | 414.8% |
| 1950 | 123 | | −11.5% |
| 1960 | 231 | | 87.8% |
| 1970 | 573 | | 148.1% |
| 1980 | 397 | | −30.7% |
| 1990 | 328 | | −17.4% |
| 2000 | 326 | | −0.6% |
| 2010 | 290 | | −11.0% |
| 2020 | 287 | | −1.0% |
U.S. Decennial Census

=== 2010 census ===
As of the census of 2010, there were 290 people, 130 households, and 100 families living in the city. The population density was 271.0 inhabitants per square mile (104.6/km^{2}). There were 151 housing units at an average density of 141.1 per square mile (54.5/km^{2}). The racial makeup of the city was 96.2% White, 0.3% African American, 2.8% Asian, and 0.7% from two or more races. Hispanic or Latino residents of any race were 0.3% of the population.

There were 130 households, of which 14.6% had children under the age of 18 living with them, 70.8% were married couples living together, 3.1% had a female householder with no husband present, 3.1% had a male householder with no wife present, and 23.1% were non-families. 22.3% of all households were made up of individuals, and 9.2% had someone living alone who was 65 years of age or older. The average household size was 2.23 and the average family size was 2.58.

The median age in the city was 55.3 years. 12.1% of residents were under the age of 18; 5.8% were between the ages of 18 and 24; 10.7% were from 25 to 44; 43.8% were from 45 to 64; and 27.6% were 65 years of age or older. The gender makeup of the city was 47.2% male and 52.8% female.

=== 2000 census ===
As of the census of 2000, there were 326 people, 132 households, and 104 families living in the city. The population density was 314.5 inhabitants per square mile (121.4/km^{2}). There were 146 housing units at an average density of 140.8 per square mile (54.4/km^{2}). The racial makeup of the city was 96.32% White, 0.92% African American and 2.76% Asian. Hispanic or Latino of any race were 1.23% of the population.

There were 132 households, out of which 25.8% had children under the age of 18 living with them, 76.5% were married couples living together, 0.8% had a female householder with no husband present, and 21.2% were non-families. 20.5% of all households were made up of individuals, and 7.6% had someone living alone who was 65 years of age or older. The average household size was 2.47 and the average family size was 2.83.

In the city, 20.2% of the population was under the age of 18, 4.3% from 18 to 24, 17.5% from 25 to 44, 36.8% from 45 to 64, and 21.2% was 65 years of age or older. The median age was 49 years. For every 100 females, there were 106.3 males. For every 100 females age 18 and over, there were 101.6 males.

The median income for a household in the city was $114,524, and the median income for a family was $131,261. Males had a median income of $100,000 versus $48,750 for females. The per capita income for the city was $83,792. None of the families and 1.2% of the population were living below the poverty line, including none under eighteen and 2.6% of those over 64.

== Education ==
A portion is in the Pontiac School District.
