= List of solar telescopes =

Ground-based solar telescopes are specialized telescopes used to observe the Sun from Earth's surface. Solar telescopes often have multiple focal lengths, and use a various combination of mirrors such as coelostats, lenses, and tubes for instruments including spectrographs, cameras, or coronagraphs. There are many types of instruments that have been designed to observe Earth's Sun, for example, in the 20th century solar towers were common.

== Ground telescopes ==
=== Optical telescopes ===
Name/Observatory	Image	Aperture	Year(s)	Location	Country(s)	Note(s)
Daniel K. Inouye Solar Telescope (DKIST)		400 cm	2019–	Haleakalā, Maui, Hawaii, United States	United States	
Chinese Large Solar Telescope (CLST)		180 cm	2019–	Chengdu, Sichuan, China	China	First light 10 December 2019
GREGOR, Teide Observatory		150 cm	2012–	Tenerife, Spain	Germany	
Goode Solar Telescope (GST), Big Bear Solar Observatory		160 cm	2008–	California, United States	United States	
New Vacuum Solar Telescope (NVST), Yunnan Astronomical Observatory		100 cm	2010–	Yunnan, China	China	100 cm vacuum solar telescope
Andrei Severny Tower Solar Telescope, Crimean Astrophysical Observatory		90 cm	1954–	Crimea		
Multi-Purpose Automated Solar Telescope, Sayan Solar Observatory		80 cm		Mondy, Republic of Buryatia, Russia	Russia	Located in the mountains at 2000m altitude.
Large Solar Vakuum Telescope, Baikal Astrophysical Observatory		76 cm	1980–	Irkutsk Oblast, Russia	Russia	Located on the Coast of Lake Baikal.
Optical and Near-Infrared Solar Eruption Tracer (ONSET), School of Astronomy & Space Science, Nanjing University		3x27.5 cm	2010–	Nanjing, China	China	The ONSET consists of four tubes: (1) a near-infrared vacuum tube, with an aperture of 27.5 cm, (2) a chromospheric vacuum tube, with an aperture of 27.5 cm, (3) a WL vacuum tube, with an aperture of 20 cm and (4) a guiding tube.
Bulgarian 15-cm Solar Coronagraph, Rozhen National Astronomical Observatory Bulgaria		100 cm	2005–	Rozhen, Bulgaria	Bulgaria	
Swedish Solar Telescope (SST), Roque de los Muchachos Observatory		100 cm	2002–	La Palma, Spain	Sweden	
Prairie View Solar Observatory (PVSO)		35 cm	1999–	Texas, United States	United States	
Upgraded Coronal Multi-Channel Polarimeter (UCOMP)		20 cm	2021–	Mauna Loa, Hawaii, United States	United States	
K-Coronagraph (K-COR)		20 cm	2013–	Mauna Loa, Hawaii, United States	United States	
Dutch Open Telescope (DOT), Roque de los Muchachos Observatory		45 cm	1997–	La Palma, Spain	Netherlands	
THÉMIS Solar Telescope, Teide Observatory		90 cm	1996–	Tenerife, Spain	Italy and France	
Vacuum Tower Telescope (VTT), Teide Observatory		70 cm	1989–	Tenerife, Spain	Germany	
Hida Domeless Solar Telescope (ja)		60 cm	1979–	Takayama, Gifu, Japan	Japan	
Udaipur Solar Observatory; MAST; Full Disk H-alpha Telescope; H-alpha Spar Telescope; Coudé Telescope		50 cm 15 cm 25 cm 15 cm	1976–	Udaipur, India	India	
Richard B. Dunn Solar Telescope (DST), Sacramento Peak		76 cm	1969–	Sunspot Solar Observatory, Sunspot, New Mexico, United States	United States	
Solar Observatory Tower Meudon		60 cm	1968–	Meudon, France	France	
McMath–Pierce solar telescope, KPO		161 cm	1961–	Arizona, United States	United States	Largest aperture optical and infrared solar telescope for nearly six decades
ARIES Observatory		15 cm	1961–	Nainital, India	India	
Solar Tunnel Telescope, Kodaikanal Solar Observatory		61 cm	1958–	Kodaikanal, India	India	
45-cm-Turmteleskop		45 cm	1943–	Schauinsland, Germany	Germany	
Gregory Coudé Telescope		45 cm	1959-	Locarno, Switzerland	Switzerland	Operated by the Universitäts-Sternwarte Göttingen until 1984 and by IRSOL after 1984.
Solar Tower Telescope by Zeiss		45 cm	1930–	Tokyo, Japan	Japan	
Einsteinturm		60 cm	1924–	Potsdam, Germany	Germany	
150-foot tower, Mount Wilson Observatory		30 cm	1912–	California, United States	United States	
Snow Solar Telescope, Mount Wilson Observatory		61 cm	1904–	California, United States	United States	First solar telescope
Lerebour/Grubb-Parsons, Kodaikanal Solar Observatory		20 cm	1901–	Kodaikanal, India	India (1947- ) United Kingdom (1901–1950)	
Solar-T		2x7.6 cm	2016	Antarctica	Brazil	
Swedish Vacuum Solar Telescope, Roque de los Muchachos Observatory		47.5 cm	1985–2000	La Palma, Spain	Sweden	Replaced by the SST
Gregory Coude Telescope (GCT)		45 cm	1984–2002	Tenerife, Spain (1984–2002)	Germany	Replaced by GREGOR
Evans Solar Facility (ESF), Sacramento Peak		40 cm	1953–2014	Sunspot Solar Observatory, Sunspot, New Mexico, United States	United States	
Göttinger Sonnenturm (Solar Tower Telescope)		2x15 cm 11 cm	1942–2004	Göttingen, Germany	Germany	65 cm-Coelostat by Zeiss, feeding light into several small light paths in tower
McMath-Hulbert Observatory		61 cm	1941–1979	Michigan, United States	United States	
50-foot tower, McMath-Hulbert Observatory		40 cm	1936–1979	Michigan, United States	United States	
10.5 inch, McMath-Hulbert Observatory		26.7 cm	1930–1941	Michigan, United States	United States	Replaced by the 24 inch in 1941
Arcetri Solar Tower, Arcetri Observatory		37 cm	1925-2006	Arcetri, Italy	Italy	

Telescopes for the Sun have existed for hundreds of years, this list is not complete and only goes back to 1900.

=== Potential future optical telescopes ===
Name/Observatory	Image	Aperture d.	Status	Location	Country(s)	Note
Coronal Solar Magnetism Observatory (COSMO)		150 cm	proposed		United States	
National Large Solar Telescope (NLST)		200 cm	proposed	Merak Village, Ladakh, India	India	
Chinese Giant Solar Telescope (CGST)		500–800 cm	planned	Western part of China	China	
European Solar Telescope (EST)		400+ cm	planned	Canary Islands	15 European countries	

=== Radio telescopes ===
Name/Observatory	Image	Frequency range	Year(s)	Location	Country(s)	Note(s)
Chinese Spectral Radioheliograph (CSRH)		0.4 - 2.0 Ghz; 2.0 - 15 GHz	2013 -	Inner Mongolia, China	China	40x 4.5m dishes - low freq band 60x 2m dishes - high freq band Radio imaging-spectroscopy observations of the Sun in decimetric and centimetric wavelengths
Nançay Radioheliographe (NRH), Nançay Radio Observatory		150–450 MHz		Sologne, Centre-Val de Loire, France	France	
Expanded Owens Valley Solar Array (EOVSA)		1–18 GHz		Sologne, Centre-Val de Loire, France	France	Previously known as the Owens Valley Solar Array (OVSA) before getting an expansion to upgrade its control system and increase the total number of antennas to 15.
Nobeyama Radioheliograph (NoRH), Nobeyama Radio Observatory		17 and 34 GHz		Minamimaki, Nagano Prefecture, Japan	Japan	
Nobeyama Radio Polarimeters, Nobeyama Radio Observatory		1, 2, 3.75, 9.4, 17, 35, and 80 GHz		Minamimaki, Nagano Prefecture, Japan	Japan	
Siberian Solar Radio Telescope (SSRT)			1983–	Republic of Buryatia, Russia	Russia	
Solar Submillimeter Telescope (SST), Complejo Astronomico El Leoncito		212 and 405 GHz	1999–	San Juan Province, Argentina	Argentina	SST is the only solar submillimeter telescope currently in operation.
Polarization Emission of Millimeter Activity at the Sun (POEMAS), Complejo Astronomico El Leoncito		45 and 90 GHz	2011–	San Juan Province, Argentina	Argentina	
Bleien Radio Observatory		10 MHz–5 GHz	1979–	Gränichen, Switzerland	Switzerland	
Radio Solar Telescope Network (RSTN)		245, 410, 610, 1415, 2695, 4975, 8800 and 15400 MHz		Australia; Italy; Massachusetts and Hawaii, United States	Australia, Italy, and United States	A series of four radio telescopes located at various locations around the world.
Daocheng Solar Radio Telescope		150-450 MHz	2023-	Sichuan province	China	313 parabolic antennas for detection of coronal mass ejection events. Operations started in 2023.
Mingantu interplanetary scintillation telescope		327 MHz and 654 MHz	2023-	Inner Mongolia	China	interplanetary scintillation telescope, consists of three rotatable cylindrical antennas (140 metres by 40 metres each).

== Space Telescopes ==
Solar Space Telescopes are part of the List of heliophysics missions

== Other types of solar telescopes ==
There are much smaller commercial and/or amateur telescopes such as Coronado Filters from founder and designer David Lunt, bought by Meade Instruments in 2004 and sells SolarMax solar telescopes up to 8 cm

Most solar observatories observe optically at visible, UV, and near infrared wavelengths, but other things can be observed.

- CERN Axion Solar Telescope (CAST), looks for solar axions from the early 2000s onwards
- Multi-spectral solar telescope array (MSSTA), a rocket launched payload of UV telescopes in the 1990s
- Leoncito Astronomical Complex, has a submillimeter wavelength solar telescope.
- Razdow Telescope

== See also ==
- Solar tower (astronomy)
- Lists of telescopes
