= POlarization Emission of Millimeter Activity at the Sun =

Pair of radio telescopes

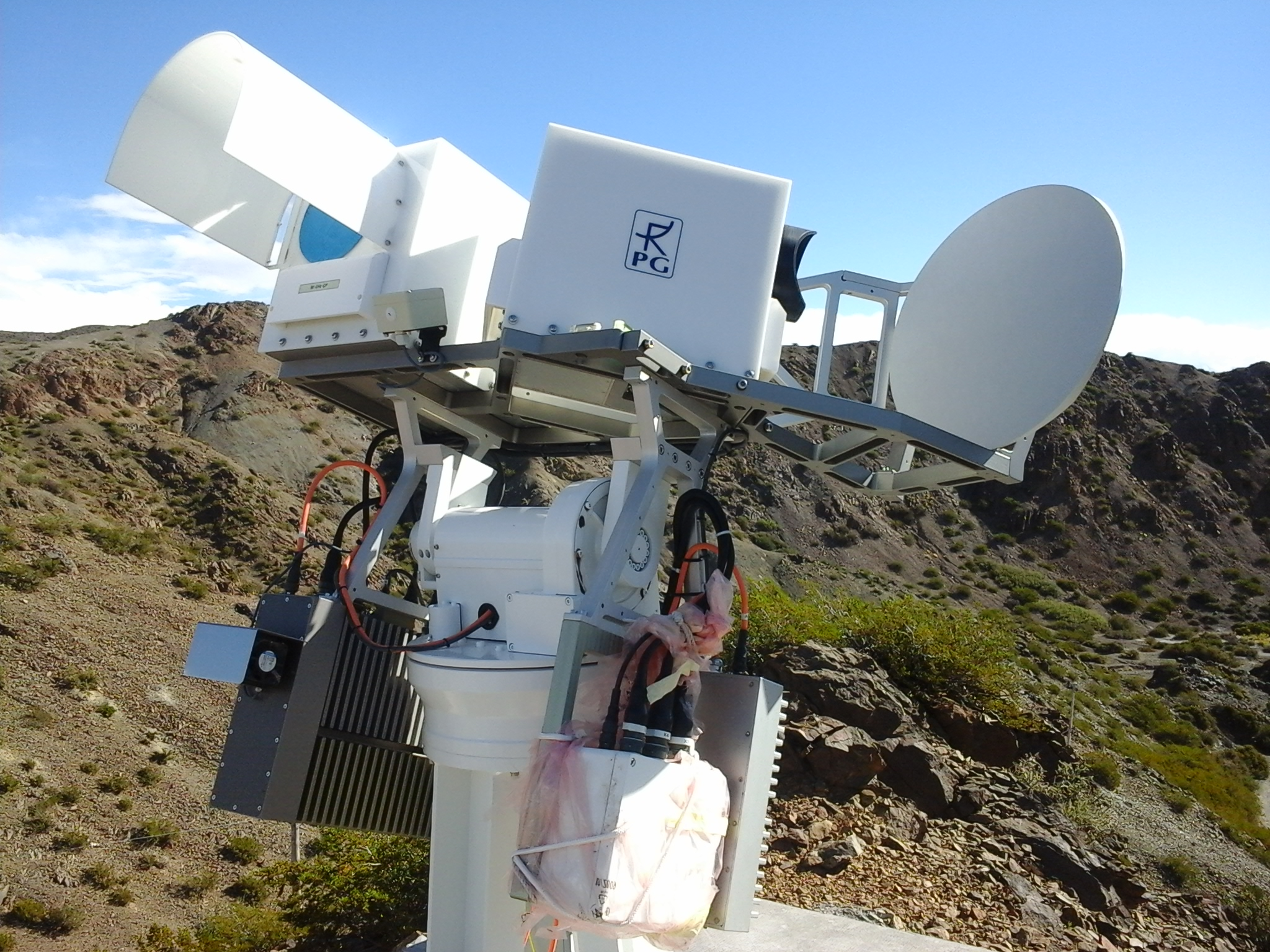
- POEMAS system installed at CASLEO
- Alternative names: POEMAS
- Location: San Juan Province, Argentina
- Coordinates: 31°47′56″S 69°17′48″W
- Altitude: 2,491 m (8,173 ft)
- Wavelength: 45, 90 GHz (6.7, 3.3 mm)
- Location within Argentina
- Related media on Commons

The POlarization Emission of Millimeter Activity at the Sun (POEMAS) is a solar patrol system composed of two radio telescopes with superheterodyne circular polarization receivers at 45 and 90 GHz. Since their half power beam width is around 1.4°, they observe the full sun. The acquisition system allows to gather 100 values per second at both frequencies and polarizations, with a sensitivity of around 20 solar flux units (SFU) (1 SFU ≡ 10^{4} Jy). The telescope saw first light in November 2011, and showed excellent performance during two years, when it observed many flares. Since November 2013 is stopped for repairing. The main interest of POEMAS is the observation of solar flares in a frequency range where there are very few detectors and fill the gap between microwaves observed with the Radio Solar Telescope Network (1 to 15.4 GHz) and submillimeter observations of the Solar Submillimeter Telescope (212 and 405 GHz). Moreover, POEMAS is the only current telescope capable of carrying on circular polarization solar flare observations at 90 GHz. (Although, in principle, ALMA band 3 may also observe at 90 GHz with circular polarization).

== Science ==
POEMAS was designed to fill the gap between microwaves and submillimeter (less than 1 mm) wavelength observations of the solar activity. There are a number of different instruments around the world that monitors the sun at microwaves. The Nobeyama Radio Heliograph (NoRH) (Nobeyama, Japan) makes daily maps at 17 GHz (1.7 cm) with circular left and right polarizations and 34 GHz (8.8 mm), total intensity. The Nobeyama Radio Polarimeters (NoRP), (Nobeyama, Japan) is a set of patrol telescopes with receivers from 1 GHz (λ≈30 cm) to 80 GHz (λ≈3.7 mm) at selected frequencies and circular polarization detection (except at 80 GHz) with full sun disk spatial resolution. The Radio Solar Telescope Network (RSTN) is worldwide network of telescopes with receivers at selected bands from few hundred MHz (λ≈75 cm) to 15.4 GHz (λ≈2 cm). At the other end of the band, the Solar Submillimeter Telescope (SST) installed at Complejo Astronomico El Leoncito in San Juan Province, Argentina observes the sun at 212 GHz (λ≈1.4 mm) and 405 GHz (λ≈0.7 mm). Since there is no observational time overlap between Japan and Argentina, the NoRH and NoRP cannot be used together with SST, and only data from some RSTN observatories have times in common with the SST.

The relevance of observing at 45 and 90 GHz comes from the necessity to determine the upturn frequency in the so-called THz events: if the main radiation mechanism is synchrotron radiation from accelerated electrons emitting at chromospheric or coronal heights, it is expected a spectrum with a long and descending logarithmic tail towards millimeter wavelengths. In some cases this classical (textbook) shape is broken and an upturn or spectral reversion is observed. Since the reversion or upturn frequency has been estimated around 50 to 100 GHz for the observed cases, the importance of POEMAS is justified.

== See also ==
- Sun
- Chromosphere
- Corona
- Solar Flares
- Radio astronomy
- List of radio telescopes
- Synchrotron radiation
