= ATST =

ATST may refer to:

- Daniel K. Inouye Solar Telescope, formerly known as Advanced Technology Solar Telescope
- All Terrain Scout Transport (AT-ST), 2-legged type Imperial Walker from the Star Wars fictional universe
- Atari ST, personal home computer
