= McMath–Pierce solar telescope =

Telescope in Pima County, Arizona

McMath–Pierce Solar Telescope
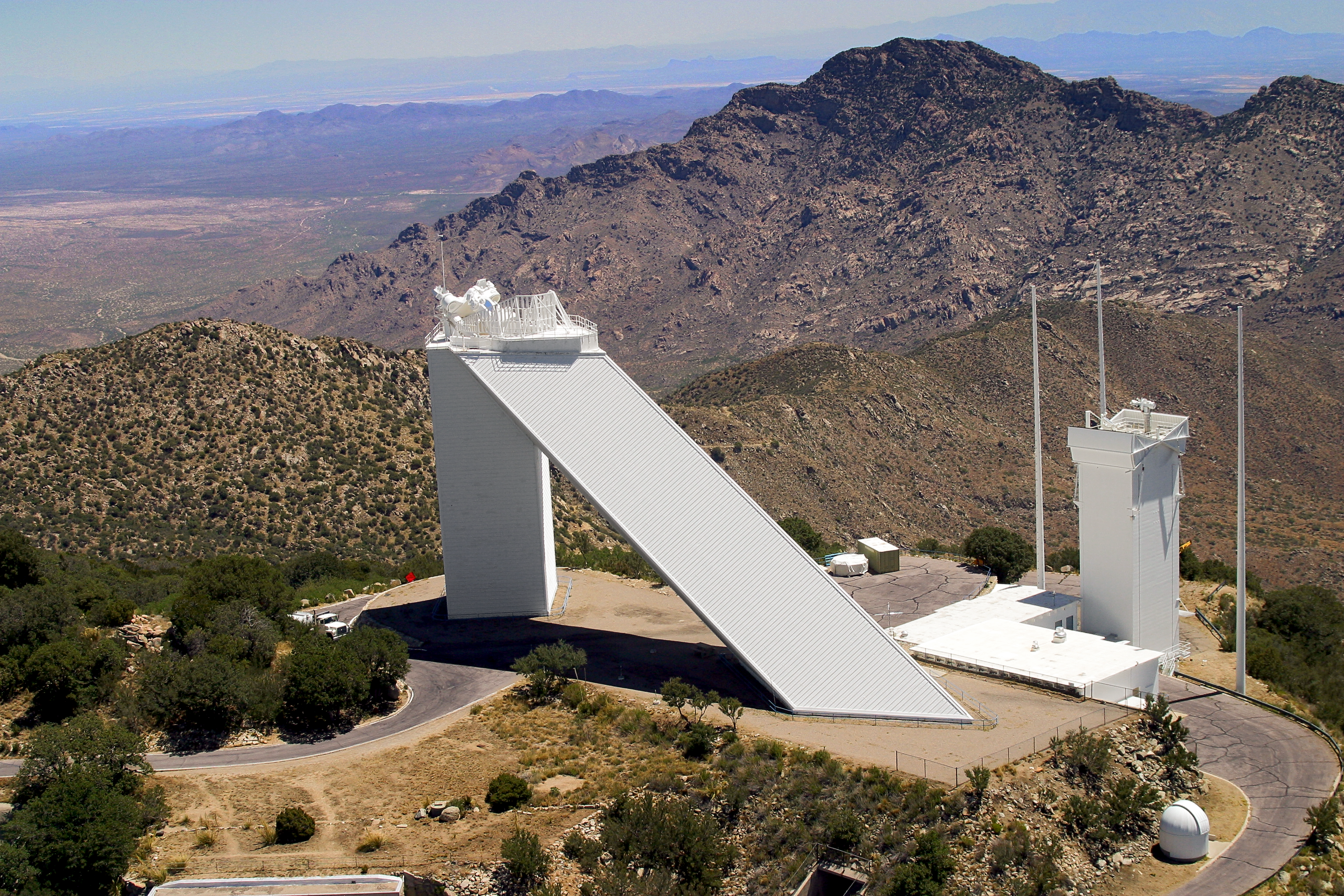
- Alternative names: McMath–Pierce Telescope
- Location(s): Arizona
- Coordinates: 31°57′30″N 111°35′42″W
- Altitude: 2,096 m (6,877 ft)
- Diameter: 161 cm (5 ft 3 in)
- Collecting area: 2.04 m^{2} (22.0 sq ft)
- Focal length: 87 m (285 ft 5 in)
- Website: noirlab.edu/public/programs/kitt-peak-national-observatory/mcmath-pierce-solar-telescope/
- Location of McMath–Pierce solar telescope
- Related media on Commons

McMath–Pierce solar telescope is a 1.6 m f/54 reflecting solar telescope at Kitt Peak National Observatory in Arizona, United States. Built in 1962, the building was designed by American architect Myron Goldsmith and Bangladeshi-American structural engineer Fazlur Rahman Khan. It was the largest solar telescope and the largest unobstructed aperture optical telescope in the world. It is named after the astronomers Robert Raynolds McMath and Keith Pierce.

It was originally called the McMath Solar Telescope, and then later renamed the McMath-Pierce Solar Telescope in 1992. Although it is designed for observation of the Sun, it can also be used to view bright objects at night.

In 2018, the telescope received a 4.5 million USD grant for an enhanced visitor center and other programs, and to overall revitalize the national icon.

== Construction ==
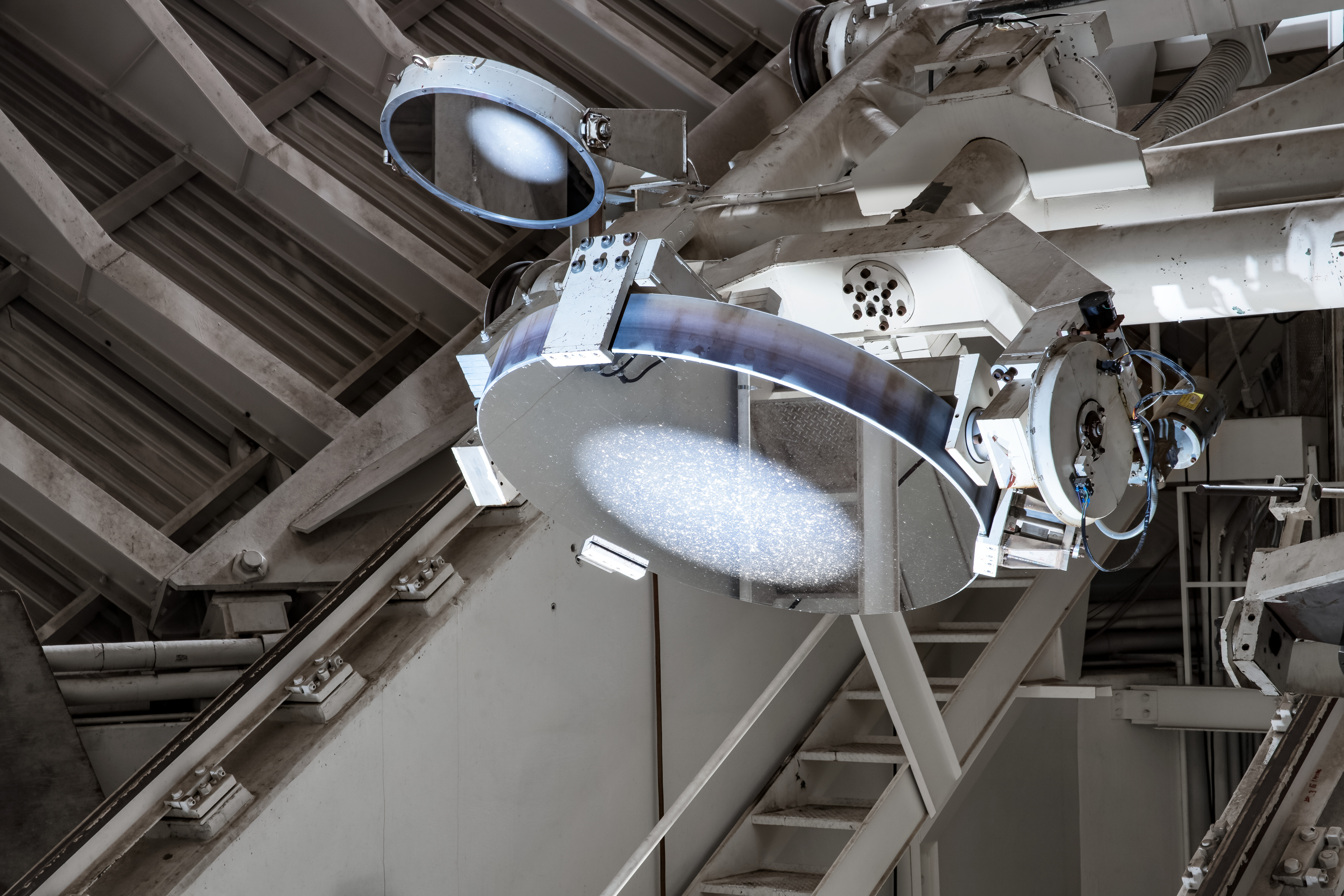
Inside the telescope

The telescope is a triple instrument. In addition to the primary 1.61 m mirror fed by the 2.03 m heliostat, there are a pair of telescopes fed by 0.81 m heliostats mounted beside the main heliostat. These two instruments, referred to as the East and West auxiliaries, have 1.07 m and 0.91 m primary mirrors.

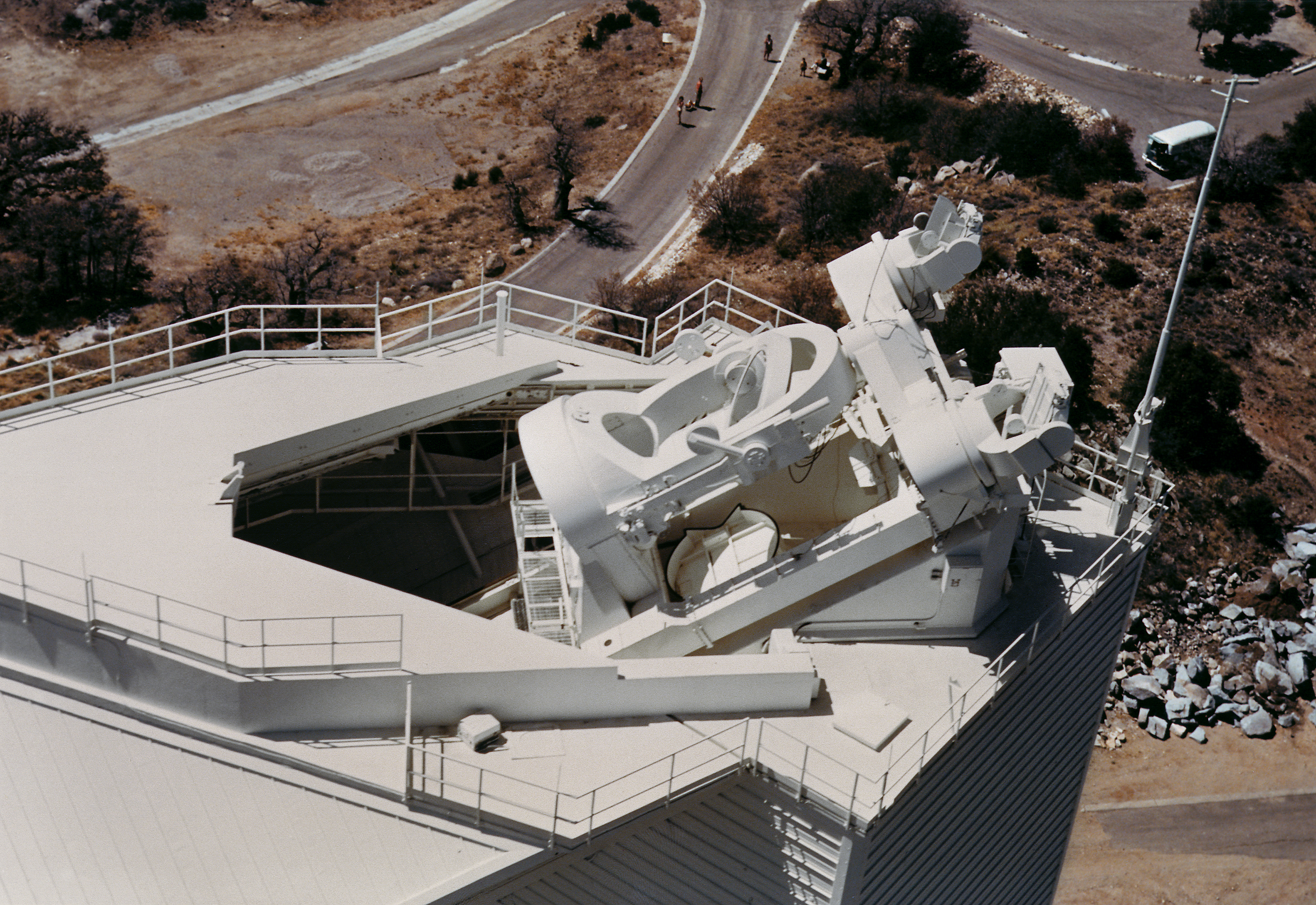
The top of the tower.

Results of adaptive optics

The telescope uses the heliostat at the top of its main tower to direct the Sun's light down a long shaft to the primary mirrors. The distinctive diagonal shaft continues underground, where the telescope's primary mirror is located. The theoretical resolution of the main telescope is 0.07 arcsec, although this is never reached because atmospheric distortions degrade the image quality severely. The image scale is 2.50 arcsec/mm at the image plane. Since 2002 the National Solar Observatory staff have developed an adaptive optics system designed for the unique needs of solar observatories that dramatically improve the resolution of science images.

The secondary telescopes are called East and West. They are completely independent of the main telescope. These two auxiliary telescopes each have a 0.91-meter heliostat located beside the main heliostat. These auxiliary telescopes have a slightly shorter focal length and f-numbers of 50 and 44. The resolution of the auxiliary telescopes is 5.11 arcsec/mm and 5.75 arcsec/mm.

The enclosure of the telescope was designed and engineered by the Chicago office of Skidmore, Owings and Merrill.

At the dedication in 1962, Dr. Waterman read a letter from President John F Kennedy starting with:

The great new solar telescope at the Kitt Peak National Observatory in Arizona is a source of pride to the nation. The largest instrument for solar research in the world, it presents American astronomers with a unique tool for investigating the nearest of the stars, our sun. This project is of exceptional interest to all our citizens...

== Instruments ==
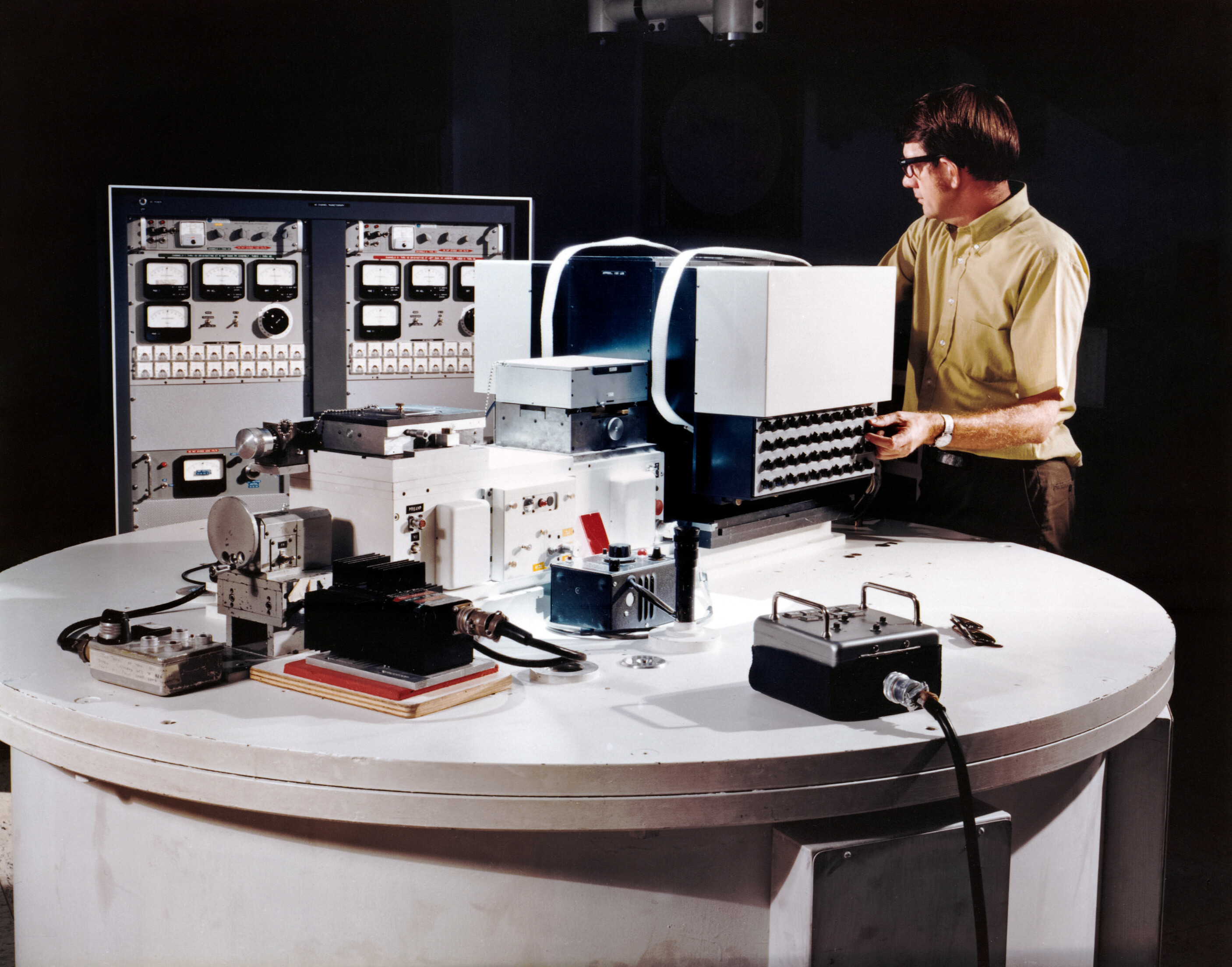
The telescope observing room

The third mirror of the main telescope which sends the light down into the observing room can be moved above three different positions. Two of these have a vacuum spectrograph beneath them, one of 18 meter deep and the other 4 meter deep with lower resolution but higher light throughput. These two spectrographs are able to rotate to compensate for the rotation of the image caused by the use of a heliostat. The third position can only be equipped with a static optical table with no image rotation correction and is therefore rarely used.

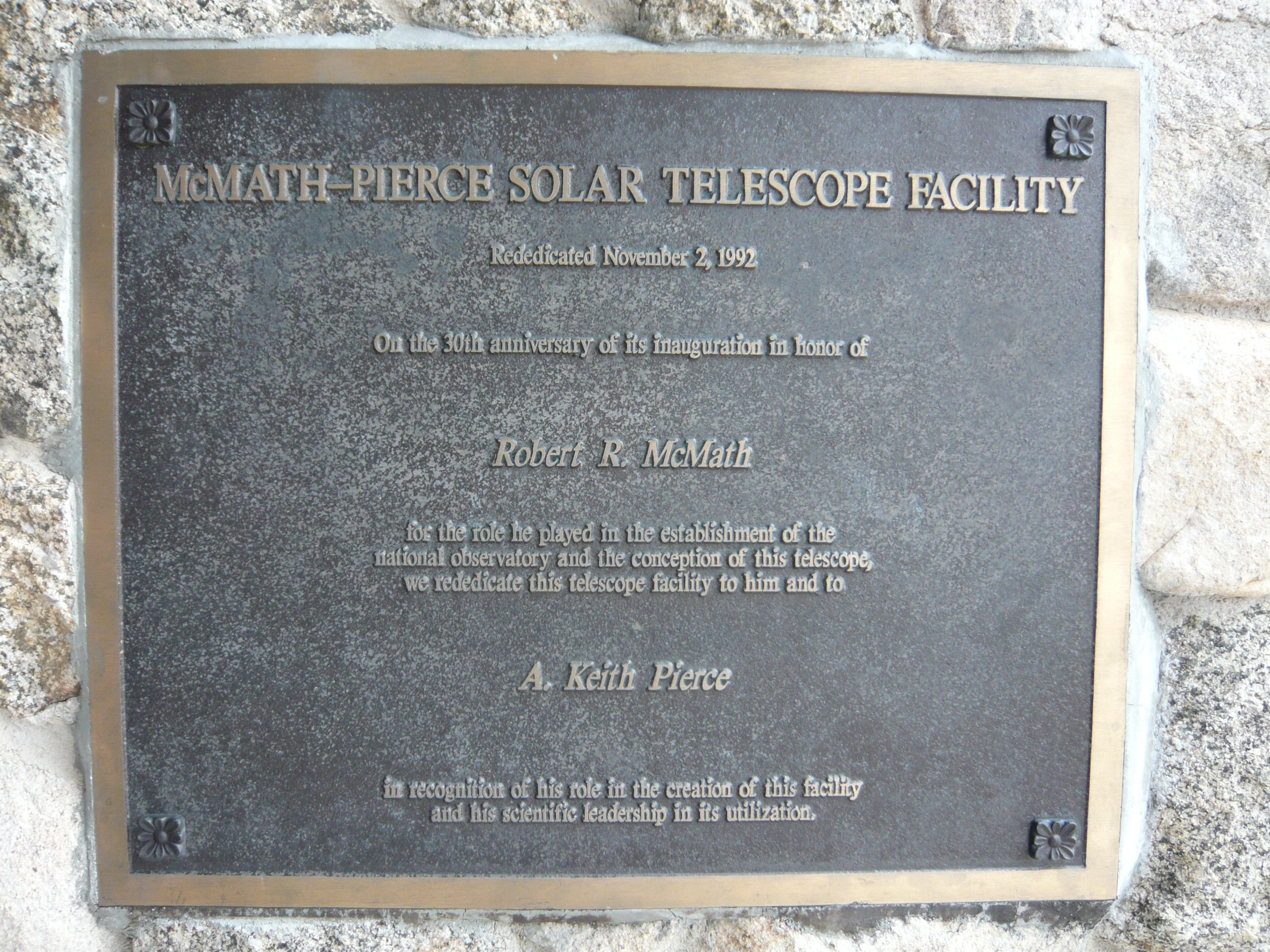
A notification of 1992 rededication of the telescope.

The auxiliary telescopes can only be used for imaging on static optical tables and do not provide image rotation correction.

== NSF divestment and reinvestment ==
In 2016, the National Science Foundation (NSF) announced that it would be divesting from the McMath-Pierce solar observatory. The operator, known as National Solar Observatory, began accepting proposals from new potential operators. A concept for retrofitting by the Kitt Peak visitor center manager was first provided to the NSF for consideration in July 2017. That concept was ultimately developed into a funding proposal to the NSF, submitted again in May 2018. This proposal was awarded in September 2018 by the NSF to the Association of Universities for Research in Astronomy, the organization that operates Kitt Peak National Observatory on behalf of the NSF.

== See also ==
- List of solar telescopes
- Lists of telescopes
- List of largest optical reflecting telescopes
- Daniel K. Inouye Solar Telescope (Major new solar telescope project of the early 21st century)
