= Keith Pierce =

American astronomer (1918-2005)

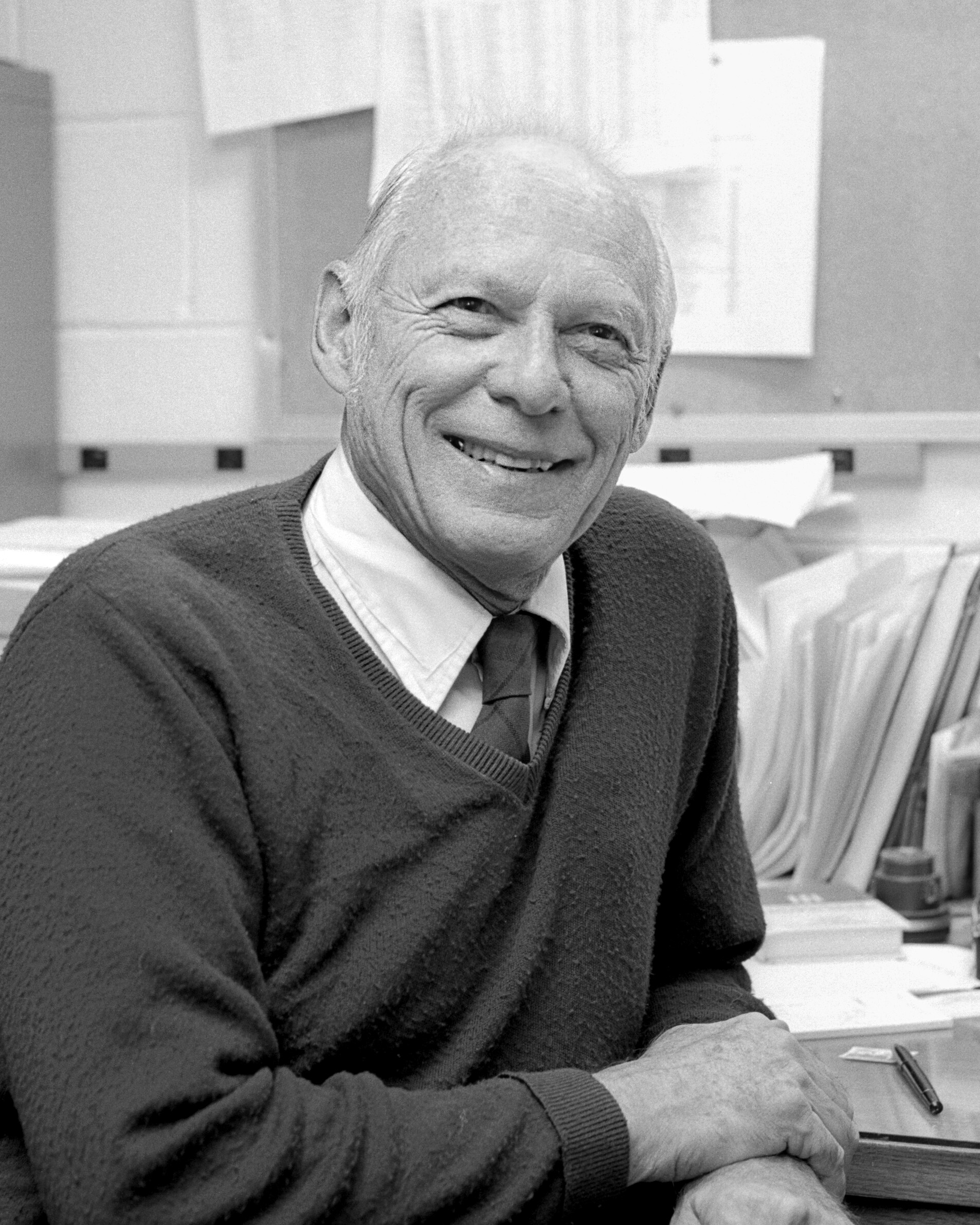
- Pierce in 1992
- Born: Austin Keith Pierce; October 2, 1918; Tacoma, Washington, U.S.
- Died: March 11, 2005 (aged 86); Tucson, Arizona, U.S.
- Education: University of Nebraska; University of California, Berkeley (BSc, PhD)
- Spouses: Mildred Buell (m. 1941) Trudy Griffin (m. 1979)
- Children: 3
- Scientific career
- Fields: Solar astronomy
- Workplaces: Lawrence Radiation Laboratory; Oak Ridge; University of Michigan; Kitt Peak National Observatory
- Thesis: Photographic and Photo-electric Profile of the Fraunhofer Line Mg B Lambda 5184 (1948)
- Doctoral advisor: C. Donald Shane

Austin Keith Pierce (October 2, 1918 – March 11, 2005) was an American solar astronomer. Pierce played a key role in the development of the McMath–Pierce solar telescope at Kitt Peak National Observatory in Arizona.

== Biography ==
Austin Keith Pierce was born October 2, 1918, in Tacoma, Washington. His father, Tracy Pierce, was a mathematician at the University of Nebraska and an amateur astronomer.

From 1936 to 1938, he studied at the University of Nebraska, before transferring to the University of California, Berkeley where in 1940 he obtained a BSc in astronomy. In 1941 he married Mildred Buell, with whom he went on to have three children.

During the Second World War, Pierce worked on uranium isotope separation as part of the Manhattan Project, first at the Lawrence Radiation Laboratory and then at Oak Ridge in Tennessee.

In 1945 he returned to Berkeley, where he completed his PhD thesis on the intensity of the solar magnesium b lines in 1948 under C. Donald Shane. He then worked at the University of Michigan for astronomer Robert McMath. McMath obtained federal funding for a large solar telescope and chose Pierce to lead the project. Pierce gained observing experience at the Mount Wilson and McMath–Hulbert solar observatories and toured European solar observatories to inform the design of the new telescope.

Kitt Peak National Observatory was chosen for the site, so in 1958 Pierce and his family relocated to Tucson, Arizona. Upon its completion in 1962 the McMath Solar Telescope was the largest solar telescope in the world. Pierce was appointed Associate Director of Kitt Peak in charge of the Solar Division, a position he held for its first 16 years.

In 1965, Pierce served a major leadership role in a multi-institutional solar eclipse expedition in support of the International Years of the Quiet Sun (IQSY) program, which was organized to observe the sun's corona during a period of minimum solar activity. As a part of a broader expedition, researchers from Kitt Peak National Observatory and the High Altitude Observatory conducted airborne and ground-based studies over the Pacific Ocean during the solar eclipse of 30 May 1965. With support from the National Science Foundation, Pierce led the ground-based expedition and arranged for the civilian yacht Goodwill to provide sea transport services on rent-free loan from its owner, Ralph E. Larrabee. On the expedition, his team sought improved measurements of the pressure, density, and temperature of the solar corona.

In 1979 he married medical anthropologist Trudy Griffin. In celebration of its 30th anniversary in 1992, the McMath telescope was rededicated as the McMath–Pierce Solar Telescope.

Pierce died of cancer on March 11, 2005, in Tucson, Arizona.
