= CGST =

CGST may refer to:

- China Graduate School of Theology
- Chinese Giant Solar Telescope
- Central Goods and Services Tax
