= USS Palomas =

Two-masted schooner

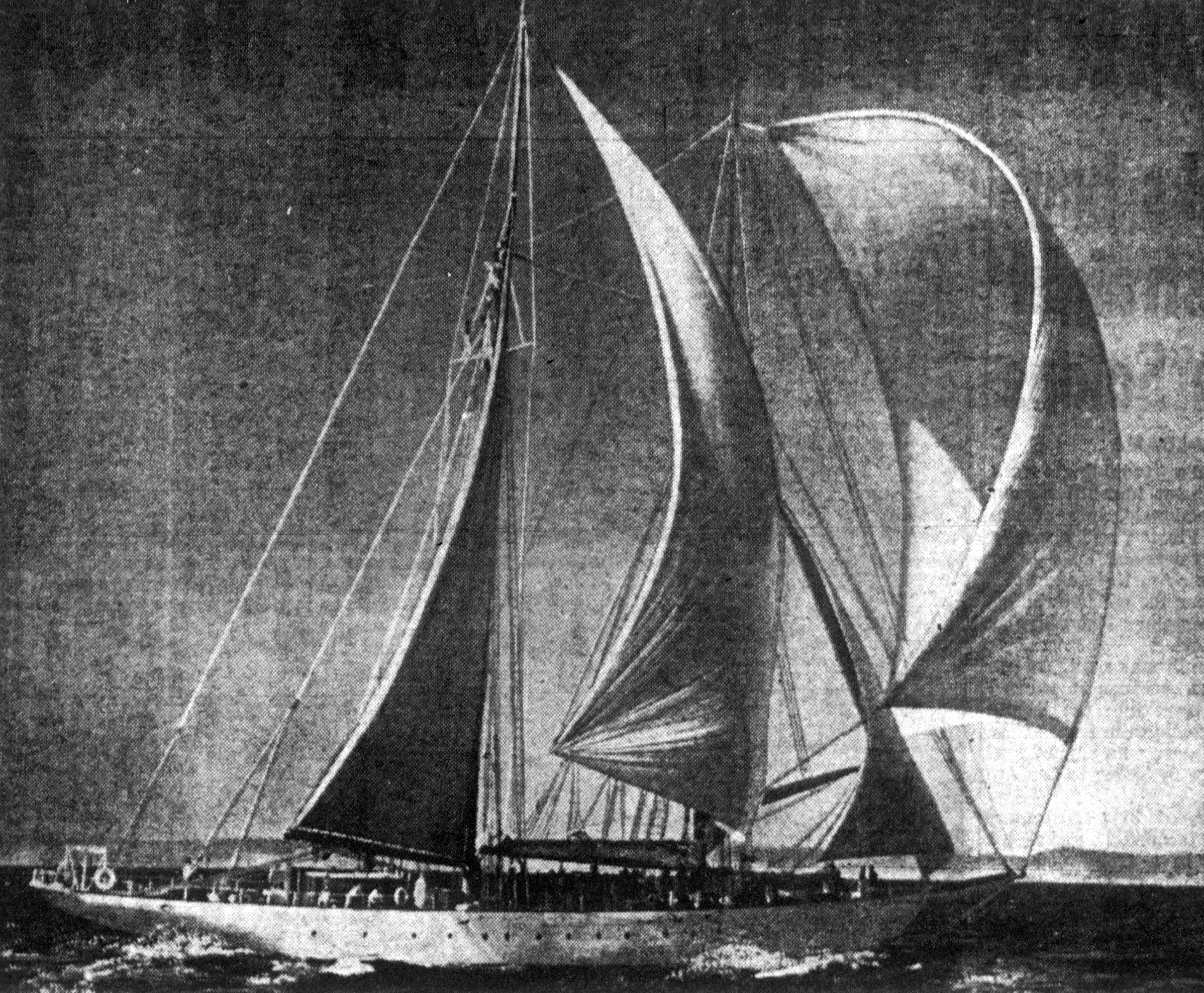
- The schooner Goodwill in 1953

History

United States
- Name: USS Palomas
- Namesake: Palomas River, New Mexico
- Builder: Bethlehem Shipbuilding Corp.
- Launched: 1922
- Acquired: 12 September 1942
- In service: 2 October 1942
- Out of service: 10 August 1946
- Stricken: 25 September 1946
- Identification: IX-91
- Fate: Sunk 25 May 1969
- Notes: Ship International Radio Callsign: NZJS

General characteristics
- Type: Schooner
- Displacement: 312 tons
- Length: 161 ft (49 m)
- Beam: 30 ft 1 in (9.17 m)
- Propulsion: 1 x Winton diesel engine
- Speed: 10 knots (19 km/h; 12 mph) (diesel only)

USS Palomas (IX-91) was a two-masted, steel-hulled, Miscellaneous Unclassified-Schooner in service with the United States Navy. She served during World War II, and briefly after the war. She was sold for disposal by the Maritime Commission in 1947.

Built as the schooner yacht Goodwill by the Bethlehem Shipbuilding Corp. in 1922, she was acquired by the U.S. Navy on 12 September 1942, and placed into service on 2 October 1942 as the Miscellaneous Unclassified-Schooner Palomas.

== History ==
Operating from San Diego, California, Palomas steamed along the southern California coast in a training capacity. A unit of the Western Sea Frontier, Palomas protected the southern California area guarding Allied and friendly shipping, and operated in a patrol capacity. She was assigned as a unit of ServRon 2 on 19 October 1943 and continued west coast operations with this unit until the war's end in 1945.

After the cessation of hostilities, Palomas served as a radar training ship, serving out of Naval Station Treasure Island. She then reported to San Francisco for disposal on 1 June 1946. She was placed out of naval service on 10 August 1946, struck from the Naval Register on 25 September 1946, and transferred to the Maritime Commission for disposal on 3 March 1947.

== Fate ==
After sale to Ralph E. Larrabee in 1951 for $35,000, her name was changed to Goodwill as she returned to civilian service. Larrabee, spent a total of $500,000 to restore her to civilian condition. She was already a famous vessel among boat racers and yacht owners. She made a name for herself, being one of the largest civilian yachts on the Pacific Ocean, and winning the TransPacific Race in both 1953 and 1959. She also made two Atlantic crossings sometime before or after her military service.

=== Solar eclipse expedition ===
In 1965, Goodwill participated in a scientific solar eclipse expedition in support of the International Years of the Quiet Sun (IQSY) program to observe the sun's corona during a period of minimum solar activity. As a part of a broader expedition, researchers from Kitt Peak National Observatory and the High Altitude Observatory conducted airborne and ground-based studies over the Pacific Ocean during the solar eclipse of 30 May 1965. Keith Pierce, astronomer and Director of Kitt Peak, led the ground-based expedition and arranged for Goodwill to provide sea transport services on rent-free loan from Larrabee. A special grant from the National Science Foundation paid for her repair, insurance, and other operational expenses. She left Los Angeles in early April, carrying a crew of 19 and approximately 30 researchers and their scientific equipment. During the eclipse on 30 May, she anchored off Manuae where she served as a platform to launch balloon-borne experiments conducted by Edward P. Ney of the University of Minnesota in a project jointly sponsored by the Office of Naval Research and NASA.

=== Sinking ===
On 25 May 1969, Goodwill ran aground on Sacramento Reef. The wreck was located 4.5 miles (7.2 km) off the coast of Baja California, and 180 miles (290 km) south of the United States border. Goodwill was reported overdue on 31 May, after she was supposed to arrive at Ensenada on 27 May. A joint search effort began with the United States Coast Guard and the Mexican Navy. On 1 July, her wreck was spotted half-careened on the reef, submerged under 25 feet (7.6 m) of water by a search helicopter. The search continued until 6 June, when a private salvage crew arrived. Two bodies of the nine aboard were recovered. By 10 June, powerful surges and tides had battered the yacht's hull, and gutted the interior; the ship was rapidly breaking up. Though investigation of the incident had continued, salvage, like the ship, was abandoned.

== Ship Awards ==
During her U.S. Navy service, Palomas earned the following decorations:

- American Campaign Medal
- World War II Victory Medal
