= European Solar Telescope =

4-m Sun observatory

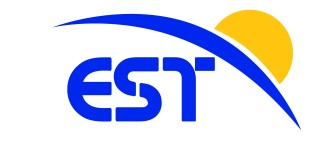
- Alternative names: EST
- Part of: Roque de los Muchachos Observatory
- Location(s): Garafía, Province of Santa Cruz de Tenerife, Canary Islands, Spain
- Built: 2023–2028
- Telescope style: solar telescope
- Diameter: 407 cm (13 ft 4 in)
- Secondary diameter: 80 cm (2 ft 7 in)
- Collecting area: 13.0 m^{2} (140 sq ft)
- Website: www.est-east.eu
- Related media on Commons

The European Solar Telescope (EST) is a pan-European project to build a next-generation 4-metre class solar telescope, to be located at the Roque de los Muchachos Observatory in the Canary Islands, Spain. It will use state-of-the-art instruments with high spatial and temporal resolution that can efficiently produce two-dimensional spectral information in order to study the Sun's magnetic coupling between its deep photosphere and upper chromosphere. This will require diagnostics of the thermal, dynamic and magnetic properties of the plasma over many scale heights, by using multiple wavelength imaging, spectroscopy and spectropolarimetry.

The EST design will strongly emphasise the use of a large number of visible and near-infrared instruments simultaneously, thereby improving photon efficiency and diagnostic capabilities relative to other existing or proposed ground-based or space-borne solar telescopes. In May 2011 EST was at the end of its conceptual design study.

The EST is being developed by the European Association for Solar Telescopes (EAST), which was set up to ensure the continuation of solar physics within the European community. Its main goal is to develop, construct and operate the EST. The European Solar Telescope is often regarded as the counterpart of the American Daniel K. Inouye Solar Telescope which finished construction in November 2021.

== Conceptual design study ==
The conceptual design study conducted by research institutions and industrial companies was finalized in May 2011. The study took 3 years, cost €7 million and was co-financed by the European Commission under the EU's Seventh Framework Programme for Research (FP7). The study estimates €150 million to design and construct the EST and projects about €6.5 million annually for its operation.

== Partners ==
The member institutes of the European Association for Solar Telescopes originate from 15 different countries.

The European Association for Solar Telescopes (EAST) is a consortium of 7 research institutions and 29 industrial partners from 15 European countries, that exists with the aim, among others, of undertaking the development of EST, to keep Europe in the frontier of Solar Physics in the world. As well as EAST intends to develop, construct and operate a next-generation large aperture European Solar Telescope (EST) in the Roque de los Muchachos Observatory, Canaries, Spain.

Institute		Location	
IGAM	Institutsbereich Geophysik, Astrophysik und Meteorologie	(Austria)	Graz
HVO	Hvar Observatory	(Croatia)	Hvar
AIASCR	Astronomical Institute AS CR	(Czech Republic)	Ondrejov
THEMIS	THEMIS S.L., (Note: The THEMIS Limited Company has been created in 2000 as a Spanish rights company and a joint operation between Spain, Italy, and France and owned by the French CNRS "Centre National de la Recherche Scientifique" (80%) and the Italian CNR "Consiglio Nazionale delle Ricerche" (20%).) INSU-CNRS, CNR	(France)	Paris
KIS	Kiepenheuer-Institut für Sonnenphysik	(Germany)	Freiburg
HSPF	Hungarian Solar Physics Foundation	(Hungary)	Gyula
INAF	Istituto Nazionale di Astrofisica	(Italy)	Rome
UU	Utrecht University, Sterrenkundig Instituut	(Netherlands)	Utrecht
ITA	Institute for Theoretical Astrophysics	(Norway)	Oslo
IA UWr	Astronomical Institute of the Wroclaw University	(Poland)	Wroclaw
AISAS	Astronomical Institute of the Slovak, Academy of Sciences	(Slovakia)	Tatranská Lomnica
IAC	Instituto de Astrofísica de Canarias	(Spain)	La Laguna
SU	Institute for Solar Physics	(Sweden)	Stockholm
IRSOL	Istituto Ricerche Solari	(Switzerland)	Locarno
UCL-MSSL	University College London - MSSL	(United Kingdom)	London

== See also ==
- Daniel K. Inouye Solar Telescope
- List of solar telescopes
