= Trudy Griffin-Pierce =

American medical anthropologist (1949–2009)

- Born: Trudy Ann Griffin; December 27, 1949; Spartanburg, South Carolina, U.S.
- Died: January 6, 2009 (aged 59)
- Occupations: Medical anthropologist; Writer; Artist; Curator
- Spouse: A. Keith Pierce (m. 1979; died 2005)

Academic background
- Education: Florida State University (BFA); University of Arizona (MA, PhD)

Academic work
- Discipline: Medical anthropology
- Institutions: University of Arizona

Trudy Ann Griffin-Pierce (December 27, 1949 – January 6, 2009) was an American medical anthropologist, writer and artist. At the time of her death she was an associate professor of anthropology at the University of Arizona.

== Biography ==
Trudy Ann Griffin was born 27 December 1949 in Spartanburg, South Carolina. She was of Catawba Indian heritage, and from a young age was fascinated with the Navajo people. Her father was in the U.S. Air Force, which saw the family move regularly. Her mother died when Griffin was 16.

Griffin graduated from Florida State University with a bachelor of fine arts. Whilst a student she contacted the chairman of the Navajo Tribe, Raymond Nakai, asking to join a Navajo family. She was put in touch with a family in Many Farms, Arizona who informally adopted her, and taught her the Navajo language and culture. Griffin enrolled at the University of Arizona to study fine arts, before switching and graduating with a MA in museum studies in 1970.

Griffin worked as a curator at the Indian Pueblo Cultural Center in Albuquerque, New Mexico, and then at Kitt Peak National Observatory. At Kitt Peak she met solar astronomer Keith Pierce, whom she married in 1979.

Griffin-Pierce returned to the University of Arizona to work on a doctorate in cultural anthropology, graduating in 1987. The same year she joined the faculty of the University of Arizona specialising in medical anthropology and native cultures. She wrote six books on Native American culture, the final book published posthumously.

Griffin-Pierce died at home January 6, 2009 aged 59. Her papers are held by the University of Arizona.

== Books ==
- Earth Is My Mother, Sky Is My Father: Space, Time, and Astronomy in Navajo Sandpainting (1992)
- The Encyclopedia of Native America (1995)
- Native America: Enduring Cultures and Traditions (1996)
- Native Peoples of the Southwest (2000)
- Chiricahua Apache Enduring Power: Naiches Puberty Ceremony Paintings (2006)
- The Columbia guide to American Indians of the Southwest (2010)
