= Meudon Solar Tower =

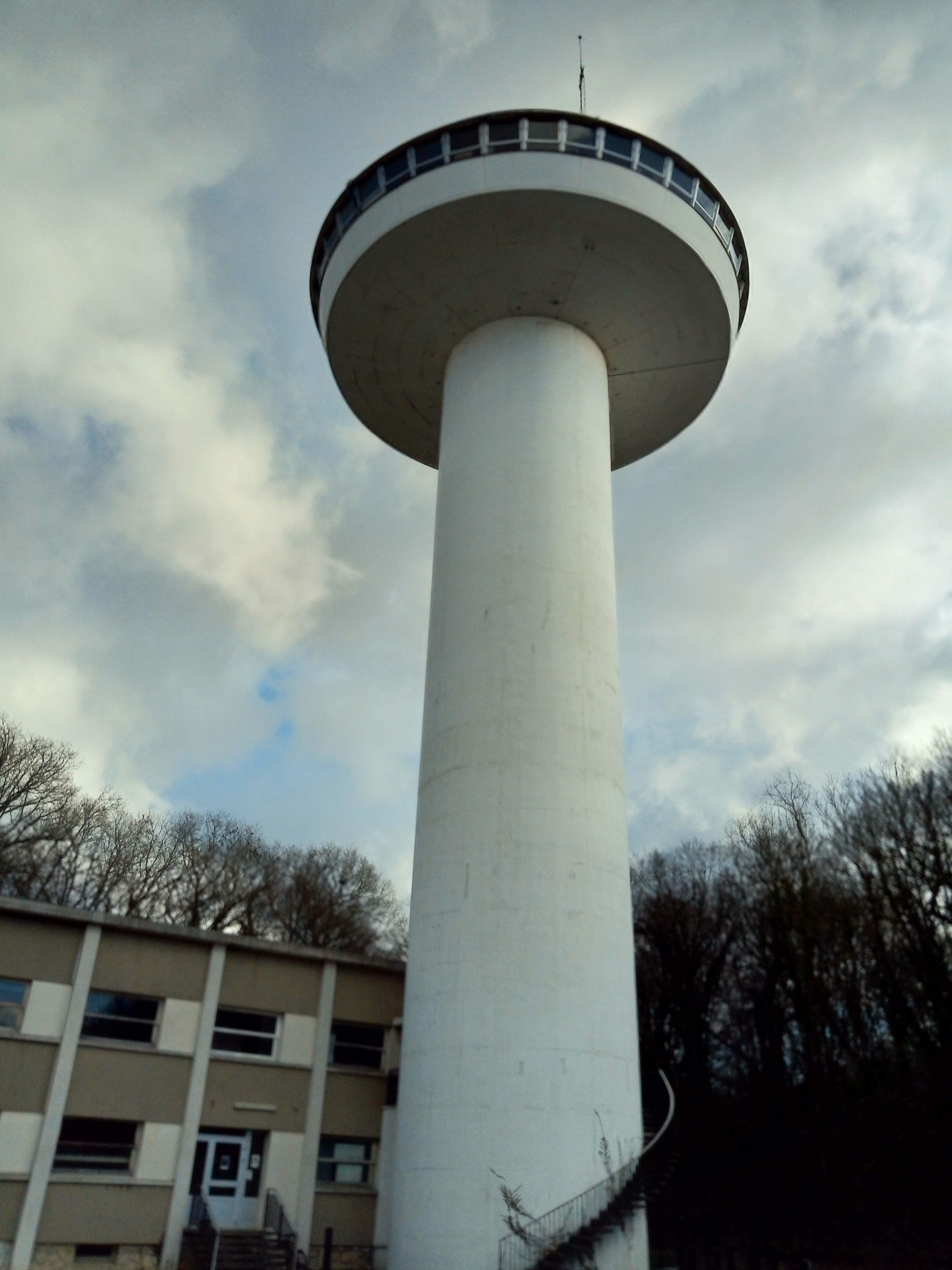
- Solar Observatory Tower Meudon in 2019
- Location: Meudon, France
- Coordinates: 48°48′16″N 2°13′38″E
- Established: 1964

The Meudon Solar Tower is a 36.47-metre-tall (119.7 ft) solar tower located at the Meudon Observatory in Meudon, France. The tower houses a 60-centimetre (24 in) solar telescope and spectrograph for observing the Sun.

Construction of the tower began in 1963, and it was commissioned in 1969. The shaft of the tower has a diameter of 6.6 metres (22 ft), and, at a height of 30.57 metres (100.3 ft), the tower has an observatory floor with a diameter of 18.4 metres (60 ft). The shaft of the tower consists of two concrete tubes which are separated by a 10-centimetre-wide (3.9 in) air spelt in order to avoid wind induced vibrations.

== See also ==
- Paris Observatory
- List of towers
- List of solar telescopes
- Meudon Great Refractor (nearby telescope facility dating to 1891)
