= Snow Solar Telescope =

Mount Wilson Observatory, California

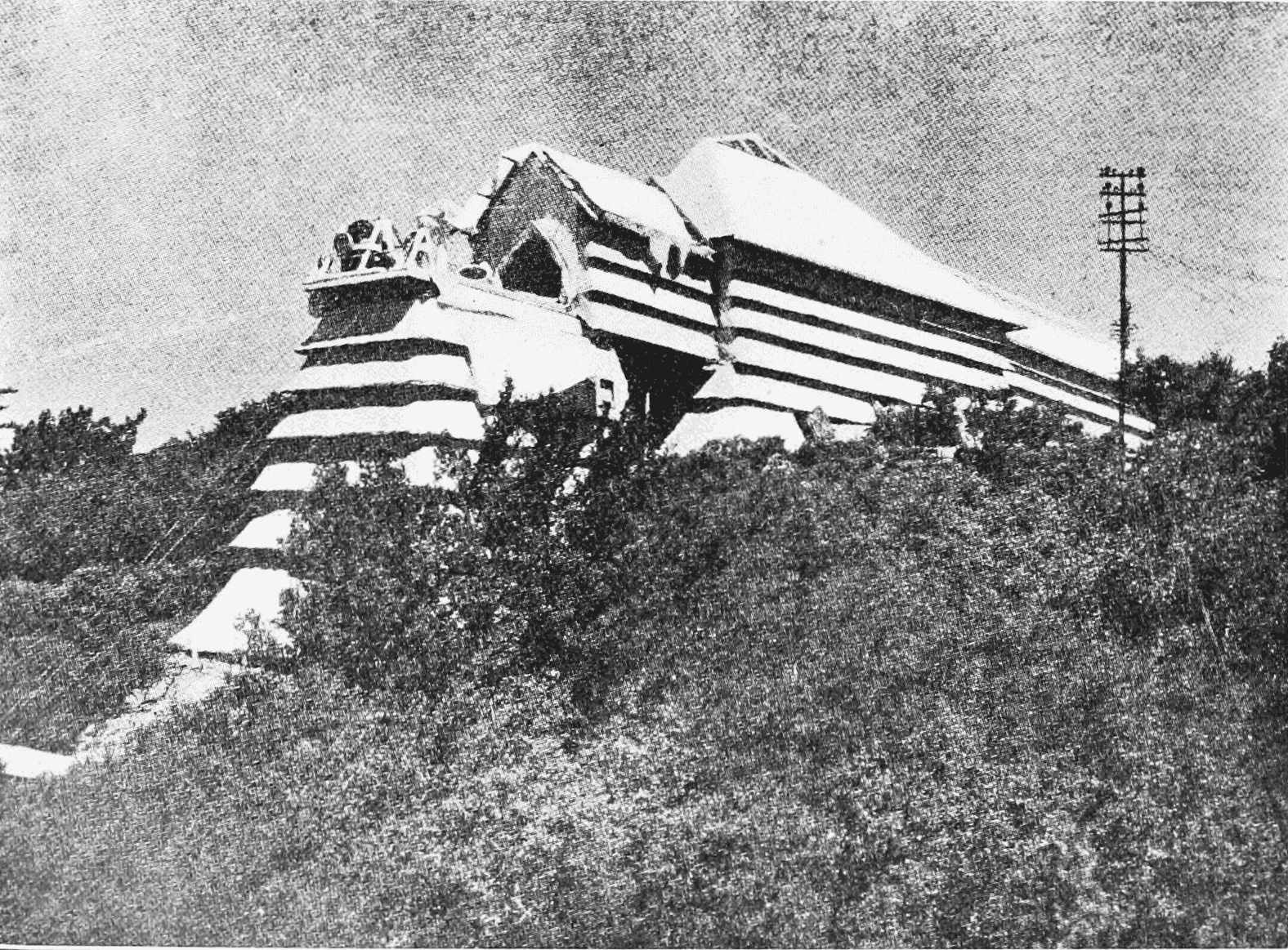
- Snow telescope housing with the coelostat mirror exposed to the sky (1912)
- Alternative names: Snow Horizontal Telescope
- Named after: George W. Snow
- Part of: Mount Wilson Observatory
- Location: Mt. Wilson, California
- Coordinates: 34°13′26″N 118°3′40″W
- Altitude: 1,794 m
- Built: 1904
- First light: March 15, 1905
- Telescope style: Coelostat
- Diameter: 30 in (76 cm)
- Website: https://www.mtwilson.edu/vt-snow-solar-telescope/
- Location within the United States

The Snow Solar Telescope is a solar telescope at the Mount Wilson Observatory in California. It was originally named the Snow Horizontal Telescope as it uses a coelostat to deflect light from the Sun into a fixed horizontal shed where it can be studied. The telescope was funded by a donation from Helen E. Snow of Chicago in 1903. It was assembled at Yerkes Observatory then transferred to Mt. Wilson in 1905.

This telescope is notable for the discovery that sunspots have a lower temperature than the photosphere, and for finding evidence they are associated with a magnetic field.

== History ==
During his time at Yerkes Observatory, American solar astronomer George Ellery Hale developed a horizontal telescope for observation of the Sun. This instrument used a 30-inch (76 cm) diameter coelostat to track the Sun and reflect the illumination onto a second mirror, which directed the light horizontally onto a concave objective mirror. The optical train produced an image of the Sun that could be examined with a spectroheliograph. The advantage of this arrangement is that the observing instruments are held steady in laboratory conditions, allowing the use of bulky devices that cannot be readily attachment to a moving telescope.

Hale's coelostat was housed on the south side of the Yerkes Observatory in a canvas-covered structure. Unfortunately, shortly after this instrument was made ready, the housing was destroyed by an electrical fire during December 1902. Most of the telescope was ruined as a result, including the coelostat mirror and a specially ruled diffraction grating.

=== Funding and relocation ===
Thanks to a donation of $10,000 by Helen E. Snow of Chicago (equivalent to $358,333 in 2025), the coelostat telescope was rebuilt in a permanent wooden shed located on the north side of the observatory. It was dedicated on October 3, 1903 and named the Snow Horizontal Telescope after her father, George W. Snow, the man sometimes credited with the invention of balloon framing. However, the performance of the new instrument proved less than satisfactory, and, given the climate and atmospheric conditions in Wisconsin, this was not expected to improve.

In 1902, Hale had been named secretary to an advisory committee on astronomy for the recently formed Carnegie Institution of Washington. He proposed to the committee the construction of a reflecting telescope with a 60-inch (150 cm) aperture, to be located on a mountain site with favorable viewing conditions near the Pacific coast. After gaining some encouraging interest, in June 1903 Hale traveled to Mt. Wilson accompanied by E. C. Pickering and W. Hussey. Hale found the viewing conditions to be excellent for solar observation. Although funds for the observatory were not forthcoming from the Carnegie Institution, Hale did manage to obtain funds from J. D. Hooker to help defray the cost of bringing the Bruce photographic telescope to the Mt. Wilson station of Yerkes Observatory.

Hale's team set up their base on Mt. Wilson on February 29, 1904. Helen Snow was initially opposed to moving the Snow Telescope to Mt. Wilson, so Hale instead brought a smaller solar telescope that had been used during the 1900 solar eclipse. Finally, in April 1904 Snow dropped her objections and allowed the relocation of the horizontal telescope to the Mt. Wilson station. The initial funding for this project came from a $10,000 grant by the Carnegie Institution, plus personal funds provided by Hale. The telescope was packed up for transport by mid-1904. Regular funding for the observatory was obtained from the Carnegie Institute later that year.

=== Assembly and testing ===
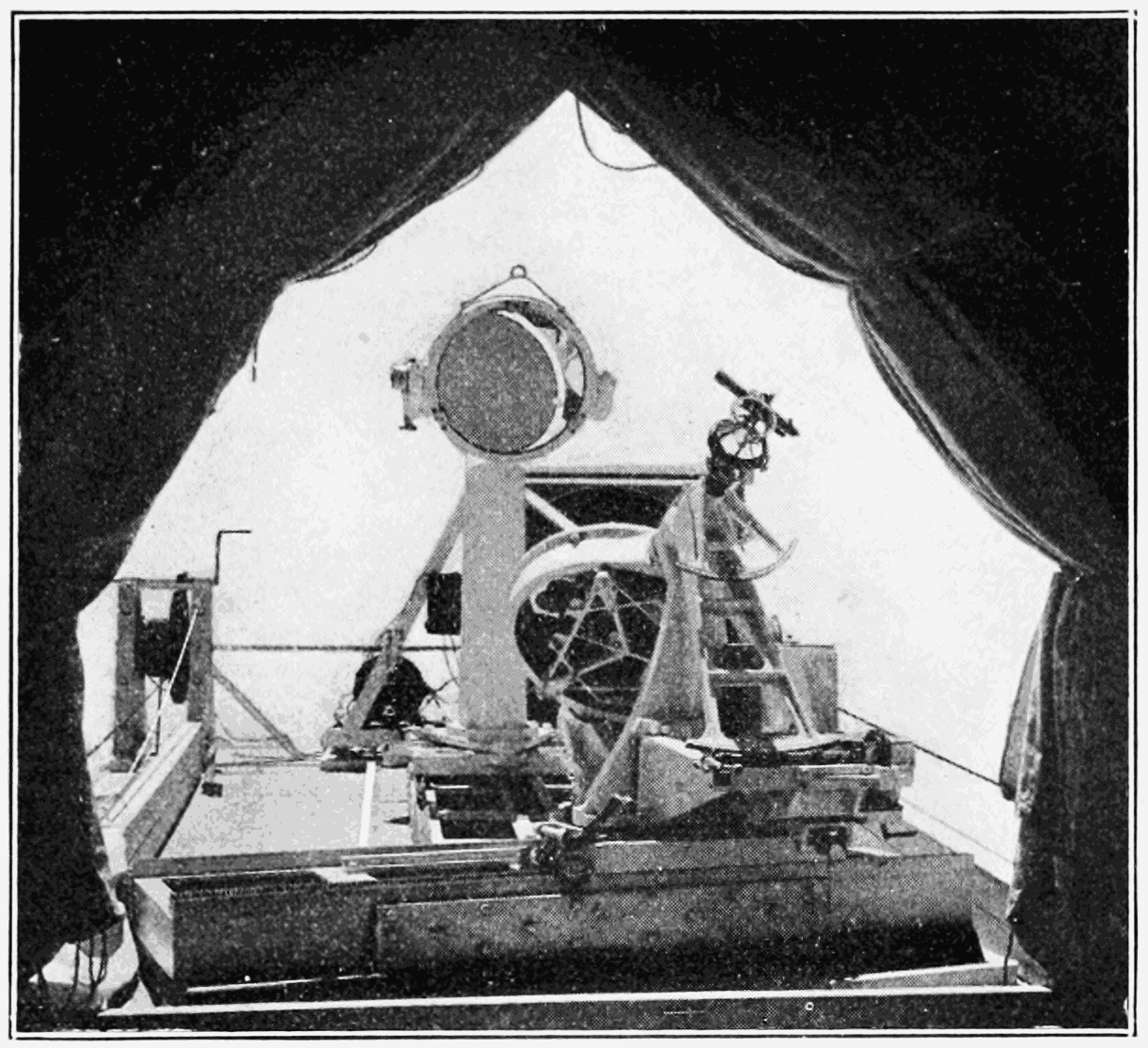
Coelostat and secondary mirror of the Snow Telescope

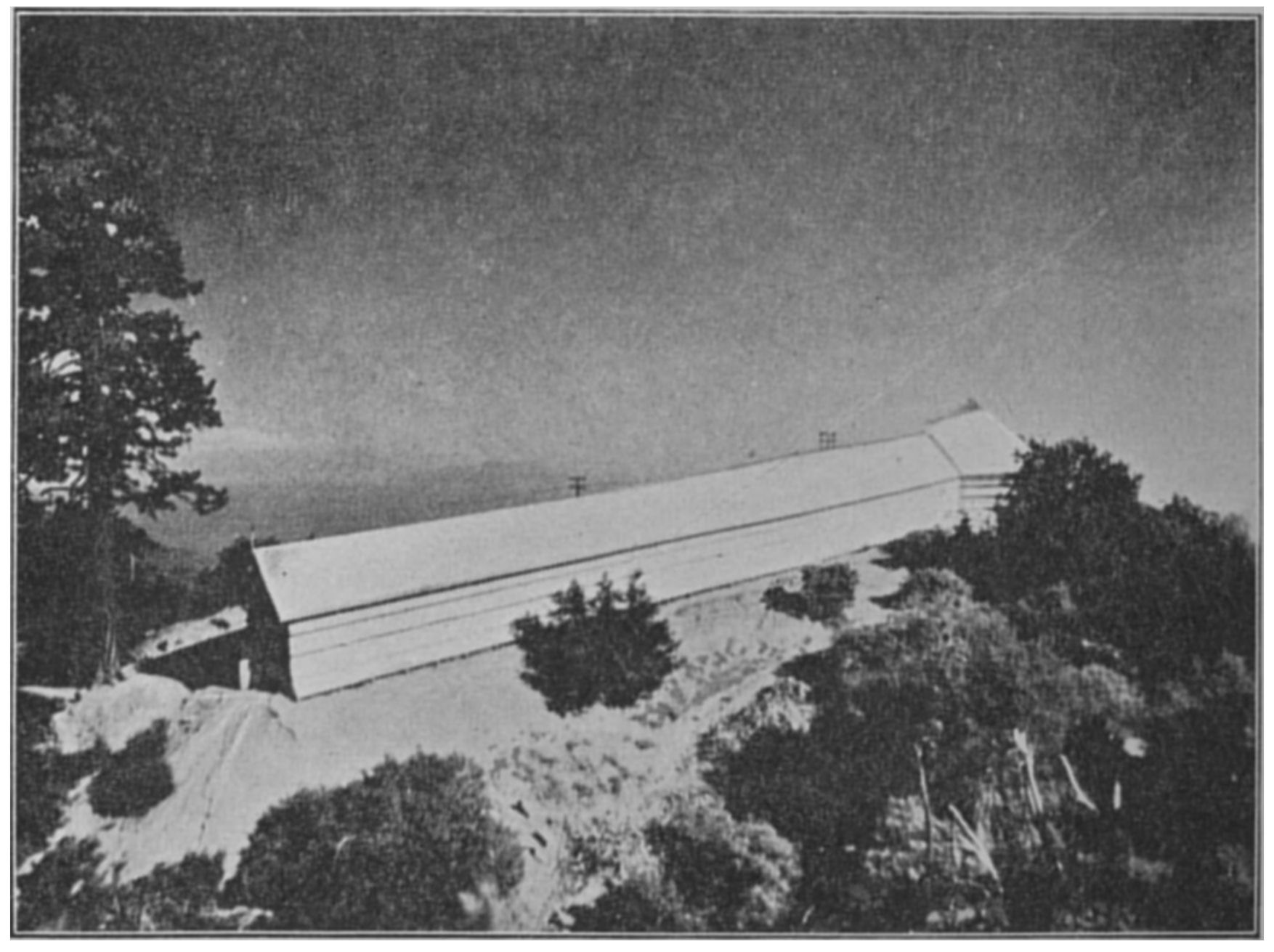
The long shed for the Snow Horizontal Telescope

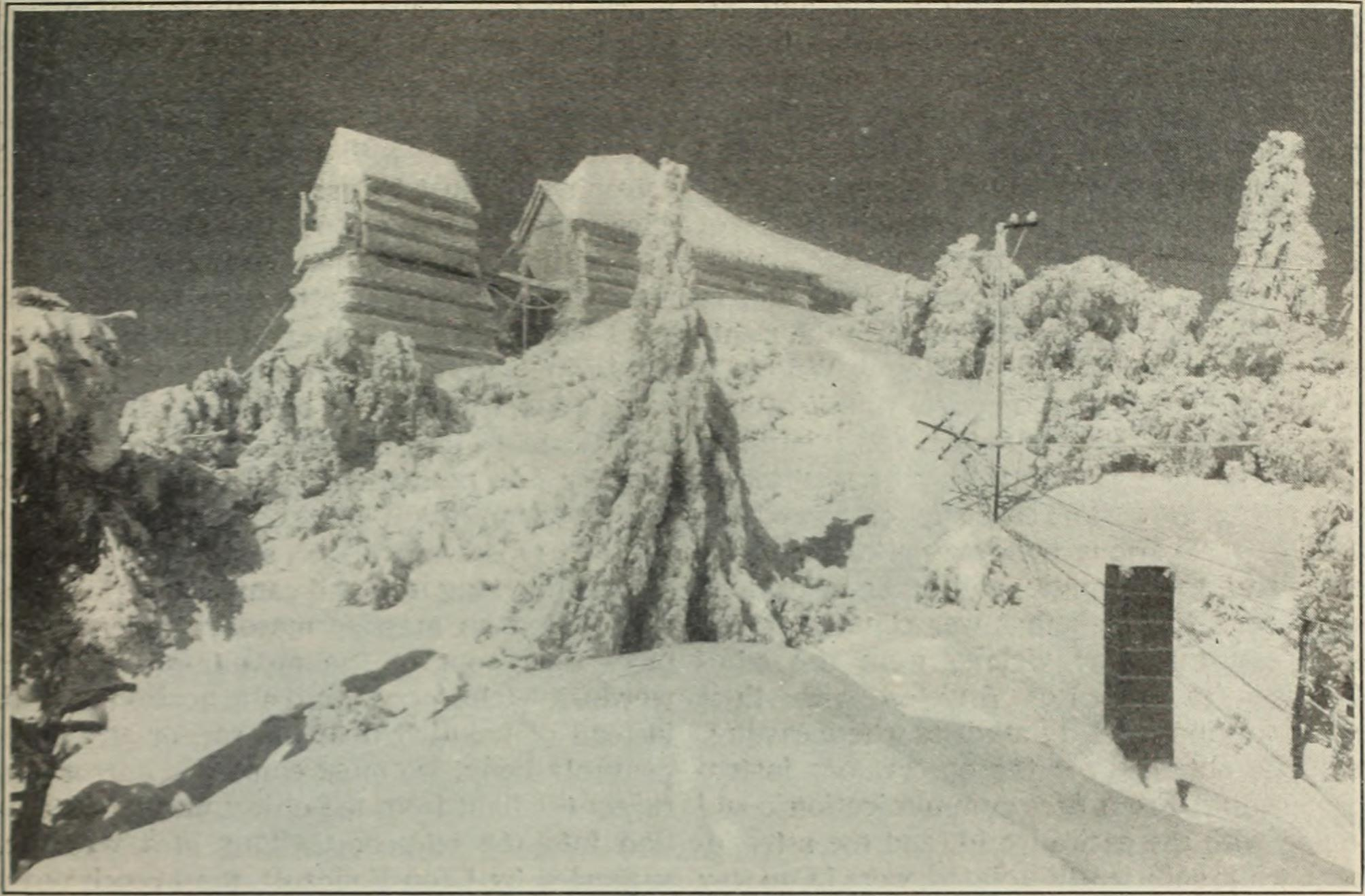
Snow Telescope during Winter

The Snow telescope was transported up the narrow mountain trail in parts using a small, specially designed carriage towed by horses. The Snow telescope was first set up during January, 1905, but due to rain the mirrors were not mounted until March 15. The coelostat was placed on a carriage that can be moved east-west, which in turn is mounted on a 24-foot (7.3 m) pedestal. There are two concave mirrors with a diameter of 24 in (61 cm). The first mirror had a focal length of 60 ft (18 m), which produced an image of the Sun with a diameter of about 6.7 in (17.0 cm). The second had a longer focal length of 143 ft (44 m), yielding an image 16 in (40.6 cm) across. A wheeled housing is used to protect the mirrors when they are not in use.

The special shed for the telescope was completed during the summer. It consisted of a steel framework with an interior canvas covering that is coated with fireproof paint. The canvas side opposite the Sun is lowered to improve circulation through the vents. The structure was built on the highest point of the site, mounted as high as possible about the heated ground, within the limitations of the budget. Skirt-like louvers surrounded the structure, protecting the interior from sunlight but allowing air circulation. Roof ventilation is used to further circulate air. Due to a slope of the ground, the shed has a 5° downward slope from front to back. It is oriented 15° east of north. Two spectrohelioscopes and three spectrograms are available for studying the image.

During testing it was found that the heat from the Sun caused the focal length of the mirrors to change. Observation of the Sun was found to be closest to optimal about an hour after sunrise. This time was also useful for minimizing the change in shape. Due to increased absorption of the atmosphere when the Sun is low, this required a longer exposure with the spectroheliograph. In order to minimize heat problems, an adjustable canvas screen was used to shield the mirrors between exposures. Electric fans are also used successfully to cool the mirrors while they are in sunlight. Photographs of the 6.7 in (17 cm) diameter solar image are taken daily. It is also tested for use with taking spectra of bright stars, such as Antares.

=== Operations ===
An original goal of the telescope was to make measurements of the solar constant over a full sunspot cycle. Daily photographs were taken of the Sun, along with specific features of sunspots and flocculi. The rotation of the Sun was investigated with a spectroscope, along with bolographic investigation of the solar absorption. A notable finding of the telescope observations was that sunspots appeared cooler than the rest of the Sun's surface. The introduction of a hydrogen alpha filter in March 1908 led to the discovery of vortices in the Sun's atmosphere. The astronomers also found evidence of a magnetic field associated with sunspots.

Until 1908, the Snow telescope was the only significant research telescope available to the observers at Mt. Wilson. However, the image quality was found to be impacted by rising air currents from the sunlit ground, for which issue a vertical tower telescope was a better design. With the completion of the 60-foot and 150-foot tower telescopes at Mt. Wilson, the Snow telescope was only employed on an intermittent basis. Still, daily photographs of the Sun continued to be taken for a period of over 12 years, and thereafter the Snow telescope was still used when observations required a mirror rather than a lens.

In 1911, the telescope underwent a significant overhaul with the goal of making it fireproof. The canvas louvers on the exterior were replaced with painted steel sheets, and the wooden roof was converted to steel. A concrete floor was laid, and the electrical wiring and controls were overhauled. By 1927, a 30-foot (9.1 m) spectrograph well had been dug. During the 1950s and 1960s, the University of Michigan attached an infrared spectrometer to the telescope and used it to study the Sun's infrared spectrum. Starting 1990, it was dedicated for the use of students and amateur astronomers.
