= Solar telescope =

Telescope used to observe the Sun

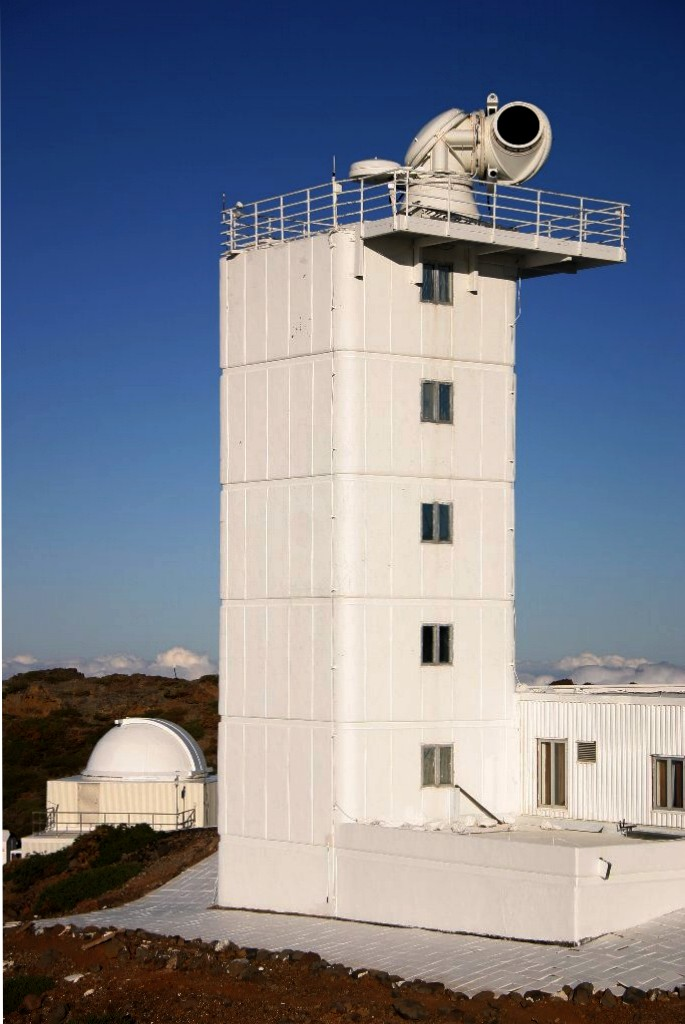
The Swedish Solar Telescope at Roque de los Muchachos Observatory, La Palma in the Canary Islands

A solar telescope or a solar observatory is a special-purpose telescope used to observe the Sun. Solar telescopes usually detect light with wavelengths in, or not far outside, the visible spectrum. Obsolete names for Sun telescopes include heliograph and photoheliograph.

== Professional ==
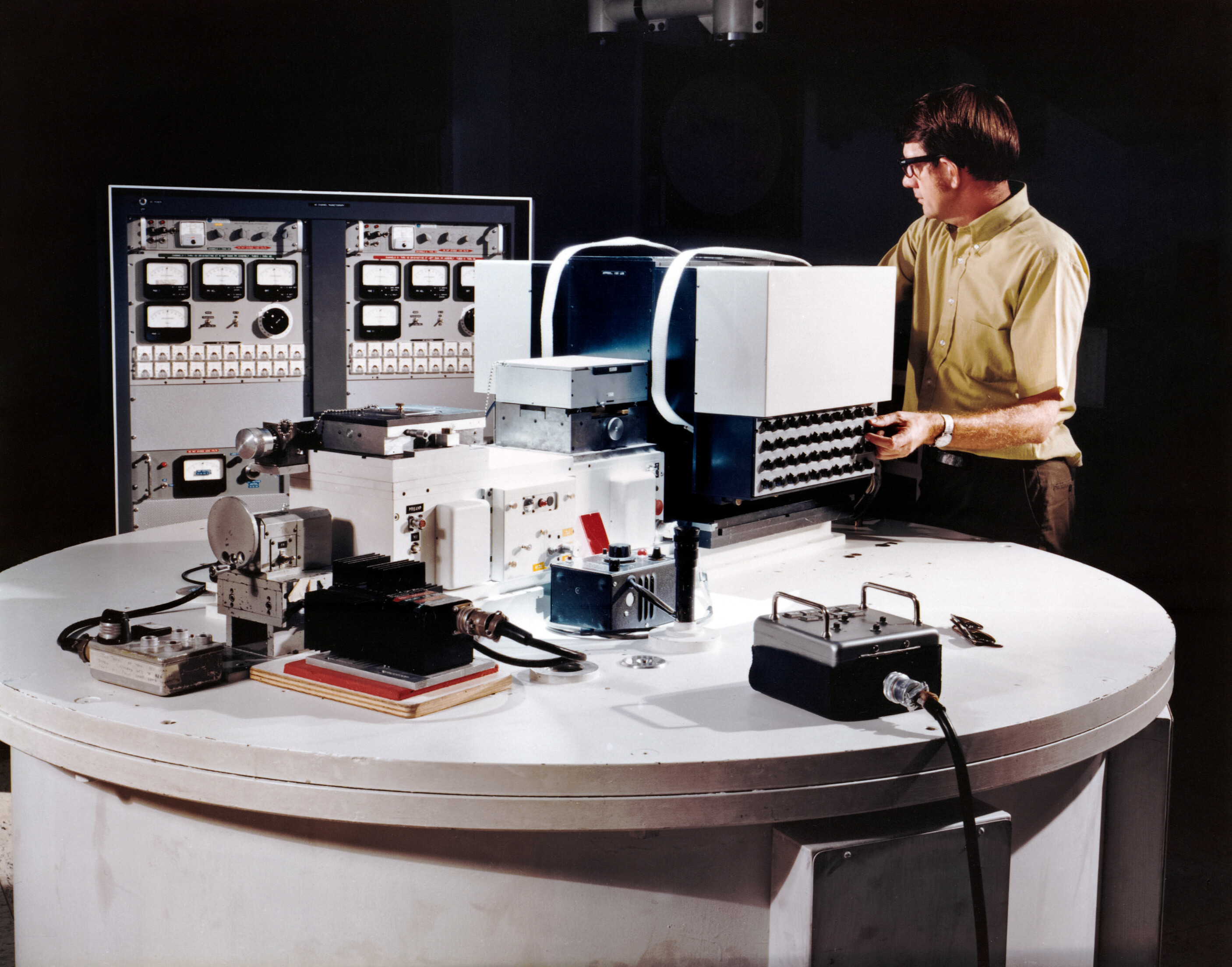
McMath–Pierce solar telescope observing room

Solar telescopes need optics large enough to achieve the best possible diffraction limit but less so for the associated light-collecting power of other astronomical telescopes. However, recently newer narrower filters and higher framerates have also driven solar telescopes towards photon-starved operations. Both the Daniel K. Inouye Solar Telescope as well as the proposed European Solar Telescope (EST) have larger apertures not only to increase the resolution, but also to increase the light-collecting power.

Because solar telescopes operate during the day, seeing is generally worse than for night-time telescopes, because the ground around the telescope is heated, which causes turbulence and degrades the resolution. To alleviate this, solar telescopes are usually built on towers and the structures are painted white. The Dutch Open Telescope is built on an open framework to allow the wind to pass through the complete structure and provide cooling around the telescope's main mirror.

Another solar telescope-specific problem is the heat generated by the tightly-focused sunlight. For this reason, a heat stop is an integral part of the design of solar telescopes. For the Daniel K. Inouye Solar Telescope, the heat load is 2.5 MW/m^{2}, with peak powers of 11.4 kW. The goal of such a heat stop is not only to survive this heat load, but also to remain cool enough not to induce any additional turbulence inside the telescope's dome.

Professional solar observatories may have main optical elements with very long focal lengths (although not always, Dutch Open Telescope) and light paths operating in a vacuum or helium to eliminate air motion due to convection inside the telescope. However, this is not possible for apertures over 1 meter, at which the pressure difference at the entrance window of the vacuum tube becomes too large. Therefore, the Daniel K. Inouye Solar Telescope and the EST have active cooling of the dome to minimize the temperature difference between the air inside and outside the telescope.

Due to the Sun's narrow path across the sky, some solar telescopes are fixed in position (and are sometimes buried underground), with the only moving part being a heliostat to track the Sun. One example of this is the McMath-Pierce Solar Telescope.

The Sun, being the closest star to earth, allows a unique chance to study stellar physics with high-resolution. It was, until the 1990s, the only star whose surface had been resolved. General topics that interest a solar astronomer are its 11-year periodicity (i.e., the Solar Cycle), sunspots, magnetic field activity (see solar dynamo), solar flares, coronal mass ejections, differential rotation, and plasma physics.

== Other types of observation ==
Most solar observatories observe optically at visible, UV, and near infrared wavelengths, but other solar phenomena can be observed — albeit not from the Earth's surface due to the absorption of the atmosphere:

- Solar X-ray astronomy, observations of the Sun in x-rays
- Multi-spectral solar telescope array (MSSTA), a rocket launched payload of UV telescopes in the 1990s
- Leoncito Astronomical Complex operated a submillimeter wavelength solar telescope.
- The Radio Solar Telescope Network (RSTN) is a network of solar observatories maintained and operated by the U.S. Air Force Weather Agency.
- CERN Axion Solar Telescope (CAST), looks for solar axions in the early 2000s

== Amateur ==
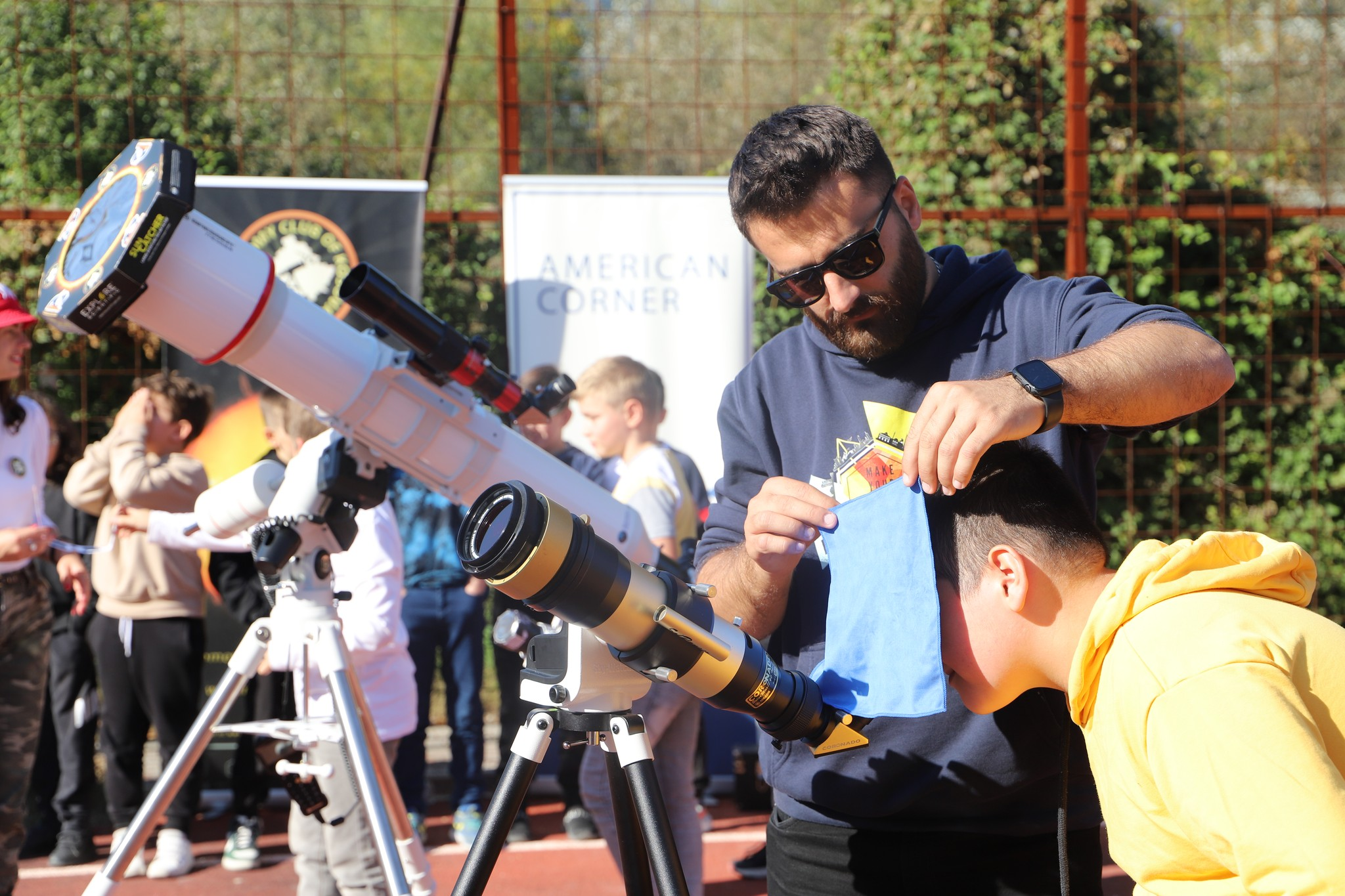
Public event organized to observe the Sun with solar telescope and solar glasses

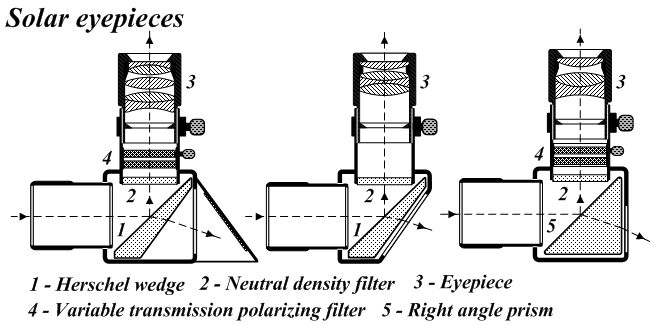
Diagram of a Herschel Wedge and other solar viewing methods

In the field of amateur astronomy there are many methods used to observe the Sun. Amateurs use everything from simple systems to project the Sun on a piece of white paper, light blocking filters, Herschel wedges which redirect 95% of the light and heat away from the eyepiece, up to hydrogen-alpha filter systems and even home built spectrohelioscopes. In contrast to professional telescopes, amateur solar telescopes are usually much smaller.

With a conventional telescope, an extremely dark filter at the opening of the primary tube is used to reduce the light of the Sun to tolerable levels. Since the full available spectrum is observed, this is known as "white-light" viewing, and the opening filter is called a "white-light filter". The problem is that even reduced, the full spectrum of white light tends to obscure many of the specific features associated with solar activity, such as prominences and details of the chromosphere. Specialized solar telescopes facilitate clear observation of such H-alpha emissions by using a bandwidth filter implemented with a Fabry-Perot etalon.

== Solar tower ==
A solar tower is a structure used to support equipment for studying the Sun, and is typically part of solar telescope designs. Solar tower observatories are also called vacuum tower telescopes. Solar towers are used to raise the observation equipment above atmospheric turbulence caused by solar heating of the ground and the radiation of the heat into the atmosphere. Traditional observatories do not have to be placed high above ground level, as they do most of their observation at night, when ground radiation is at a minimum.

The horizontal Snow solar observatory was built on Mount Wilson in 1904. It was soon found that heat radiation was disrupting observations. Almost as soon as the Snow Observatory opened, plans were started for a 60-foot-tall (18 m) tower that opened in 1908 followed by a 150-foot (46 m) tower in 1912. The 60-foot tower is currently used to study helioseismology, while the 150-foot tower is active in UCLA's Solar Cycle Program.

The term has also been used to refer to other structures used for experimental purposes, such as the Solar Tower Atmospheric Cherenkov Effect Experiment (STACEE), which is being used to study Cherenkov radiation, and the Weizmann Institute solar power tower.

Other solar telescopes that have solar towers are Richard B. Dunn Solar Telescope, Solar Observatory Tower Meudon and others.

== Selected heliophysics missions ==
- Solar Terrestrial Relations Observatory (STEREO) mission was launched in October 2006. Two identical spacecraft were launched into orbits that caused them to (respectively) pull further ahead of and fall gradually behind Earth. This enables stereoscopic imaging of the Sun and solar phenomena, such as coronal mass ejections.
- The Solar Dynamics Observatory was launched in 2010 and monitors the Sun from a geosynchronous orbit around Earth.
- Parker Solar Probe was launched in 2018 aboard a Delta IV Heavy rocket and will reach a perihelion of 0.046 AU in 2025, making it the closest-orbiting manmade satellite as the first spacecraft to fly low into the solar corona.
- Solar Orbiter mission (SolO) was launched in 2020 and will reach a minimum perihelion of 0.28 AU, making it the closest satellite with Sun-facing cameras.
- CubeSat for Solar Particles (CuSP) was launched as a rideshare on Artemis 1 on 16 November 2022 to study particles and magnetic fields.
- Indian Space Research Organisation has launched a 100 kg satellite named Aditya-L1 on 2 September 2023. Its main instrument will be a coronagraph for studying the dynamics of the solar corona.

== Selected solar telescopes ==
- The Einstein Tower (Einsteinturm) became operational in 1924
- McMath–Pierce Solar Telescope (1.6 m diameter, 1961–)
- McMath–Hulbert Observatory (24"/61 cm diameter, 1941–1979)
- Swedish Vacuum Solar Telescope (47.5 cm diameter, 1985–2000)
- Swedish 1-m Solar Telescope (1 m diameter, 2002–)
- Richard B. Dunn Solar Telescope (0.76 m diameter, 1969–)
- Mount Wilson Observatory
- Dutch Open Telescope (45 cm diameter, 1997–)
- The Teide Observatory hosts multiple solar telescopes, including
  - the 70 cm Vacuum Tower Telescope (1989–) and
  - the 1.5 m GREGOR Solar Telescope (2012–).
- Goode Solar Telescope (1.6 m, 2009–)
- Daocheng Solar Radio Telescope, Chinese radio telescope with 313 parabolic antennas
- Daniel K. Inouye Solar Telescope (DKIST), a telescope with 4 m aperture.
- European Solar Telescope (EST), a proposed 4-meter class aperture telescope.
- Chinese Giant Solar Telescope (CGST), a proposed 5- to 8-meter aperture telescope.
- National Large Solar Telescope (NLST), is a Gregorian multi-purpose open telescope proposed to be built and installed in India and aims to study the Sun's microscopic structure.

== See also ==
- List of solar telescopes (ground based)
- List of heliophysics missions – space telescopes used to observe the Sun
- List of telescope types
- Coronagraph
- Heliostat
- Heliometer
- Helioscope
- Spectroheliograph
- Spectrohelioscope
- Solar astronomy
