= Coronal rain =

Plasma falling to the Sun's photosphere

A movie of the coronal rain (right limb of sun) in the 304 Å wavelength. The footage in this video was collected by the Solar Dynamics Observatory's AIA instrument. SDO collected one frame every 12 seconds so each second in this video corresponds to 6 minutes of real time. The video covers 4:30 UTC on July 19th to 2:00 UTC on July 20th, a period of 21 hours and 30 minutes.

Coronal rain is a phenomenon that occurs in the Sun's corona when hot plasma cools and condenses in strong magnetic fields and falls to the photosphere. It is usually associated with active regions, most obviously in the aftermath of a solar flare. Coronal rain can also form after injection of material via impulsive heating anywhere in the solar atmosphere, for example in association with magnetic reconnection.

The material that makes up the coronal rain can be up to hundreds of times cooler than the surrounding environment.
