= Solar Submillimeter Telescope =

Radio telescope in Argentina

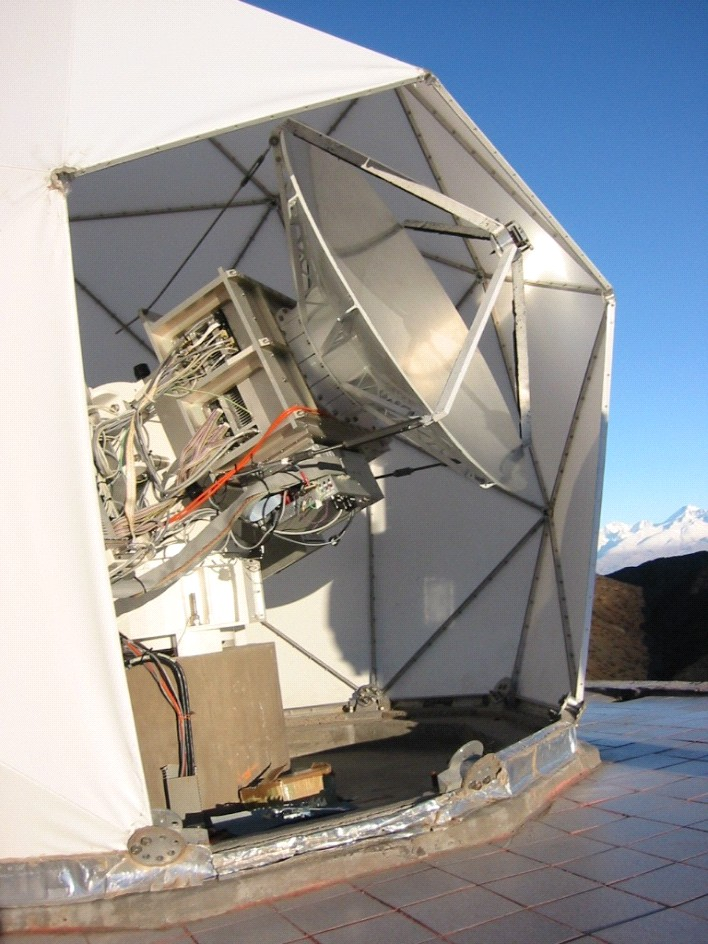
- The SST during a maintenance procedure with the radome open.
- Alternative names: SST
- Part of: Leoncito Astronomical Complex
- Location(s): San Juan Province, Argentina
- Coordinates: 31°47′56″S 69°17′48″W
- Organization: Leoncito Astronomical Complex; Mackenzie Presbyterian University
- Altitude: 2,491 m (8,173 ft)
- Wavelength: 212, 405 GHz (1.414, 0.740 mm)
- Diameter: 1.5 m (4 ft 11 in)
- Website: www.casleo.gov.ar/instrumental/sst.php
- Location of Solar Submillimeter Telescope
- Related media on Commons

The Solar Submillimeter Telescope (SST) is a solar telescope located at the Leoncito Astronomical Complex in San Juan Province, Argentina. The SST observes submillimeter radiation at 212 and 405 GHz using a 1.5-meter Cassegrain antenna. Radiation at these wavelengths is produced by high-energy particles during solar flares.

Construction of the SST started in 1995, and it achieved first light in April 1999. Since April 2001, it operates on a daily basis jointly by the Argentinian National Scientific and Technical Research Council (CONICET) and the Brazilian Mackenzie Presbyterian University.
