= Chinese Giant Solar Telescope =

Proposed Sun observatory

- Location(s): People's Republic of China

The Chinese Giant Solar Telescope (CGST) is a proposed solar telescope in China. CGST will be an infrared and optical solar telescope. Its spatial resolution is equivalent to an 8-meter-diameter telescope, and the light-gathering power equivalent to a 5-meter-diameter telescope. The major scientific goal is to get precise measurement of solar vector magnetic field with high spatial resolution. It is expected to cost US$ 90 million.

== See also ==
- List of solar telescopes
