= Razdow Telescope =

Razdow telescope at Penteli Observatory (Athens,Greece) the observer is Nicolas Matsopoulos

Razdow Laboratories, Inc. was founded by Austrian born physicist Dr. Adolph Razdow (1908–1985). A refugee of the Holocaust, he emigrated to the United States in July 1946. In the early 1960s Razdow was awarded a contract by NASA to develop and deploy a series of solar monitoring telescopes at major observatories around the globe. These devices automatically tracked the Sun across the sky, recording and transmitting television images of the solar disk in the Hydrogen-alpha spectrum. NASA Astronauts, which would soon be traversing the space around the Earth would be vulnerable to radiation storms associated with solar flares, and these telescopes were commissioned to provide a 24-hour watch on solar activity. A few of these telescopes are still in operation.
