= Daniel K. Inouye Solar Telescope =

Scientific facility at Haleakala Observatory in Hawaii, US

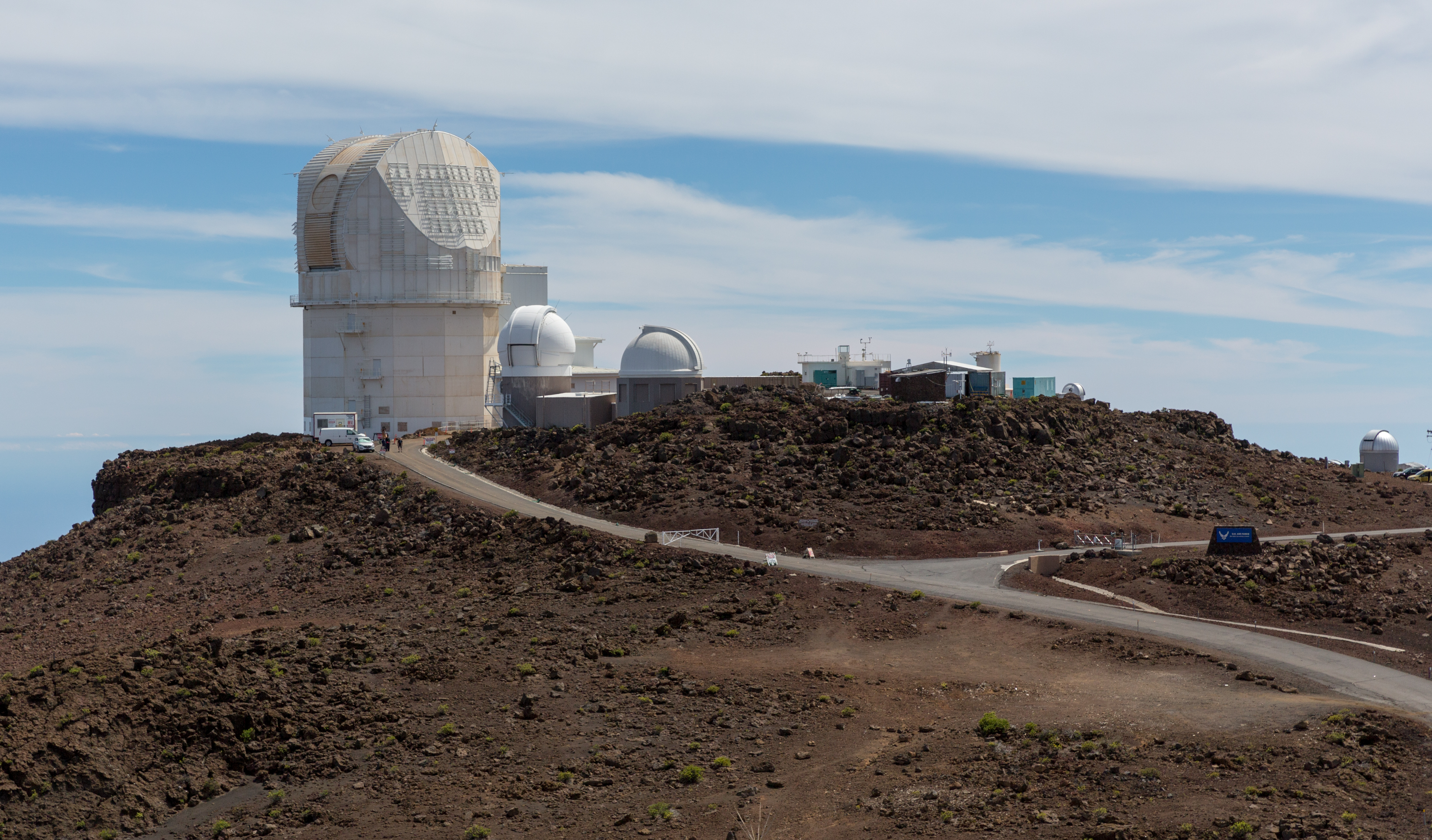
- Daniel K. Inouye Solar Telescope on the left hand side
- Alternative names: DKIST
- Location(s): Haleakalā Observatory, Haleakalā, Maui County, Hawaii
- Coordinates: 20°42′17″N 156°10′36″W
- Altitude: 3,084 m (10,118 ft)
- Wavelength: 380 nm (790 THz)–5,000 nm (60 THz)
- Diameter: 4.24 m (13 ft 11 in)
- Secondary diameter: 0.65 m (2 ft 2 in)
- Illuminated diameter: 4 m (13 ft 1 in)
- Collecting area: 12.5 m^{2} (135 sq ft)
- Website: www.nso.edu/telescopes/dki-solar-telescope
- Location within Pacific Ocean
- Related media on Commons

The Daniel K. Inouye Solar Telescope (DKIST) is a scientific facility for studies of the Sun at Haleakala Observatory on the Hawaiian island of Maui. Known as the Advanced Technology Solar Telescope (ATST) until 2013, it was named after Daniel K. Inouye, a US Senator for Hawaii. It is the world's largest solar telescope, with a 4-meter aperture. The DKIST is funded by National Science Foundation and managed by the National Solar Observatory. The total project cost is $344.13 million. It is a collaboration of numerous research institutions. Some test images were released in January 2020. The end of construction and transition into scientific observations was announced in November 2021.

The DKIST can observe the Sun in visible to near-infrared wavelengths and has a 4.24-meter primary mirror in an off-axis Gregorian configuration that provides a 4-meter clear, unobstructed aperture. Adaptive optics correct for atmospheric distortions and blurring of the solar image, which enables high-resolution observations of features on the Sun as small as 20 km (12 miles). The off-axis, clear aperture design avoids a central obstruction, minimizing scattered light. It also eases operation of adaptive optics and digital image reconstruction such as speckle imaging.

The site on the Haleakalā volcano was selected for its clear daytime weather and favourable atmospheric seeing conditions.

It commenced its first science observations on February 23, 2022, signaling the start of its year-long operations commissioning phase. Since 2018, there have been numerous calls to rename the telescope due to the discovery of Senator Inouye's alleged sexual misconduct.

== Construction ==
The contract to build the telescope was awarded in 2010, with a then-planned completion date of 2017. Physical construction at the DKIST site began in January 2013, and work on the telescope housing was completed in September 2013.

The primary mirror was delivered to the site the night of 1–2 August 2017 and the completed telescope provided images of the sun in unprecedented detail in December 2019. Further instruments, to measure the Sun's magnetic field, were to be added in the first half of 2020. Completion of construction and transition into operational phase with the first scientific observations was announced on November 22, 2021. At the time, the telescope had been over 25 years in the making (including preliminary design etc. not just the building).

== Main telescope structure ==
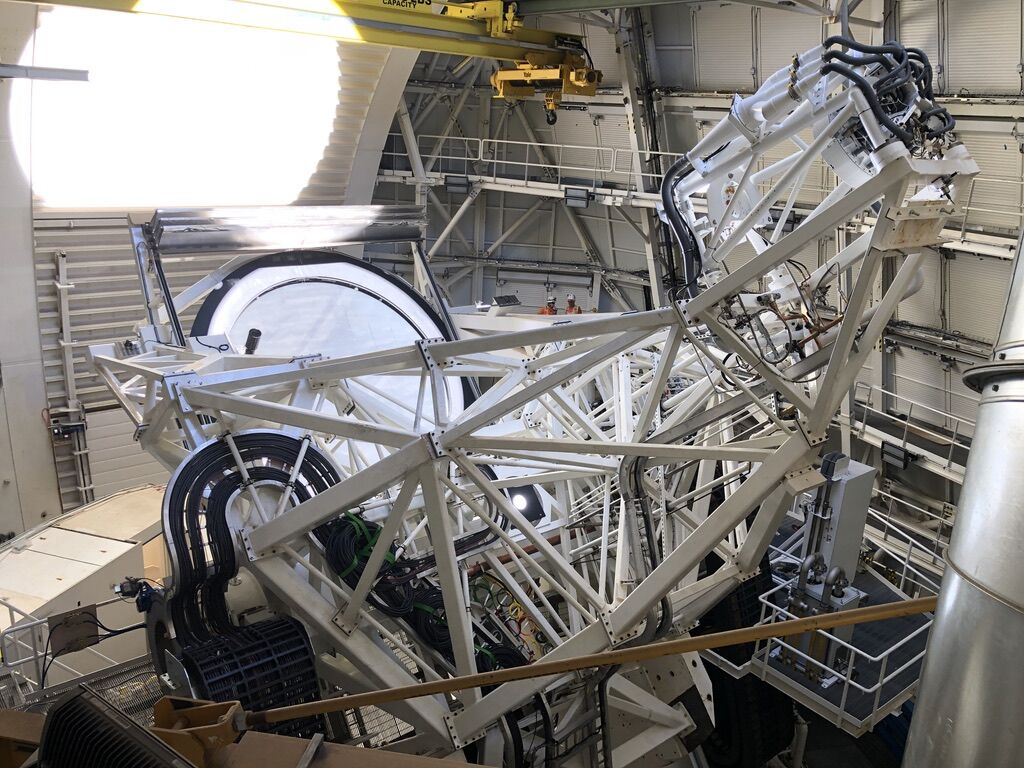
The Telescope Mount Assembly features its large 4-meter primary mirror.

The 75 mm thick f/2 primary mirror is 4.24 meters in diameter with the outer 12 cm masked, leaving a 4-meter off-axis section of a 12-meter diameter, f/0.67 concave parabola. It was cast from Zerodur by Schott and polished at the Richard F. Caris Mirror Laboratory of the University of Arizona and aluminized by the AMOS mirror coating facility.

The 0.65-meter secondary mirror, a concave ellipsoid with a focal length of 1 meter, was made from silicon carbide and is mounted on a hexapod to compensate for thermal expansion and bending of the telescope structure keeping the mirror in its optimal position.

== Adaptive and active optics ==
One key component of the DKIST is its adaptive and active optics system, which is responsible for correcting distortions in the telescope's images caused by the Earth's atmosphere. These distortions, known as "seeing," can be caused by temperature gradients and other factors in the atmosphere and can significantly degrade the quality of telescope images.

The DKIST's adaptive optics system uses a deformable mirror, which can be adjusted in real-time to correct for atmospheric distortions. The system also includes a wavefront sensor, which measures the distortions in the incoming light and feeds this information back to the deformable mirror to make the necessary adjustments.

The active optics system, on the other hand, is responsible for maintaining the telescope's focus and alignment. It uses a network of sensors and actuators to constantly monitor and adjust the position of the telescope's mirrors, ensuring that they remain properly aligned and focused.

Together, the adaptive and active optics systems allow the DKIST to produce some of the highest-resolution images of the Sun ever taken. These images can be used to study the Sun's surface and atmosphere in greater detail, helping scientists to better understand the processes that drive solar activity and space weather.

== Instrumentation ==
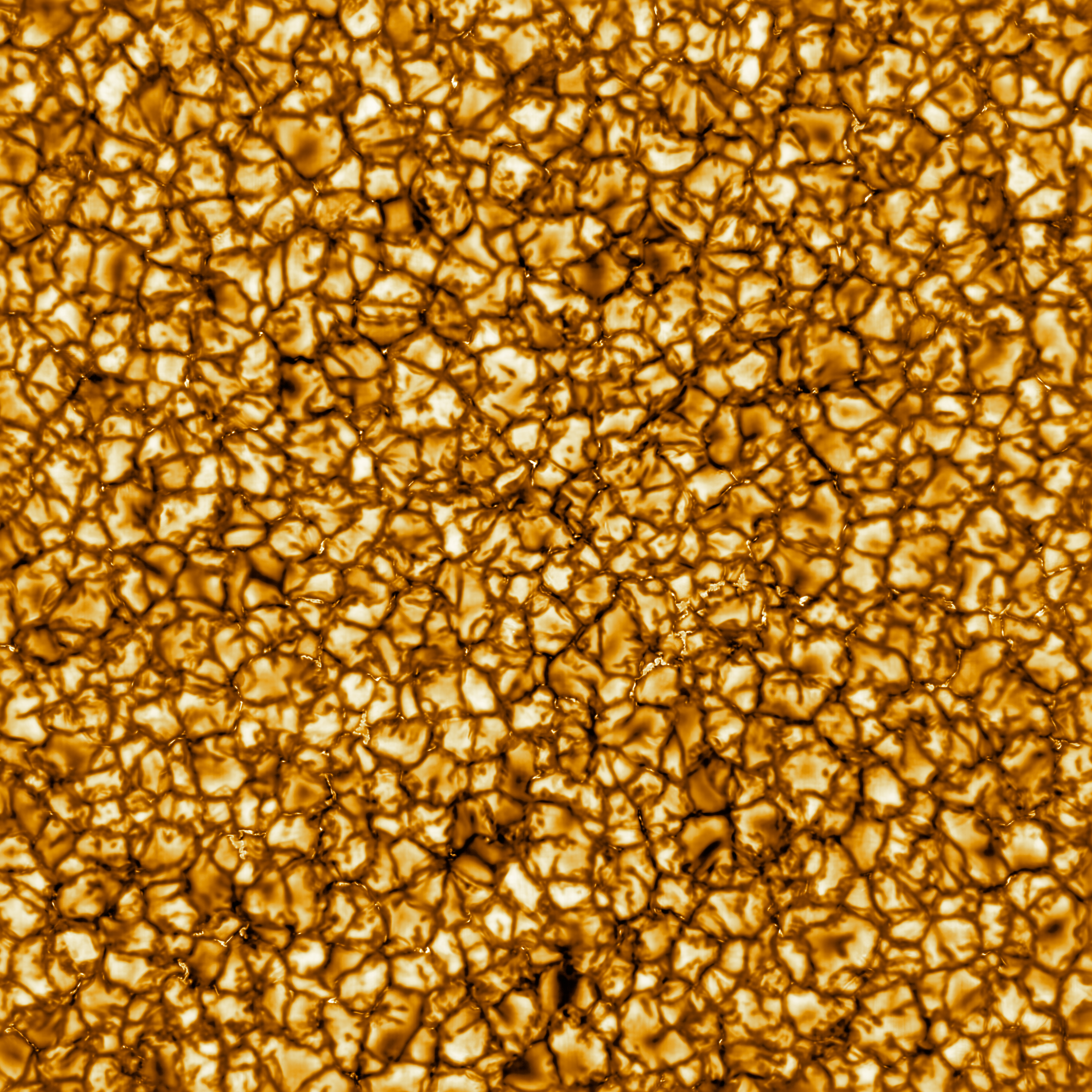
High-resolution image of the Sun's surface taken by the DKIST

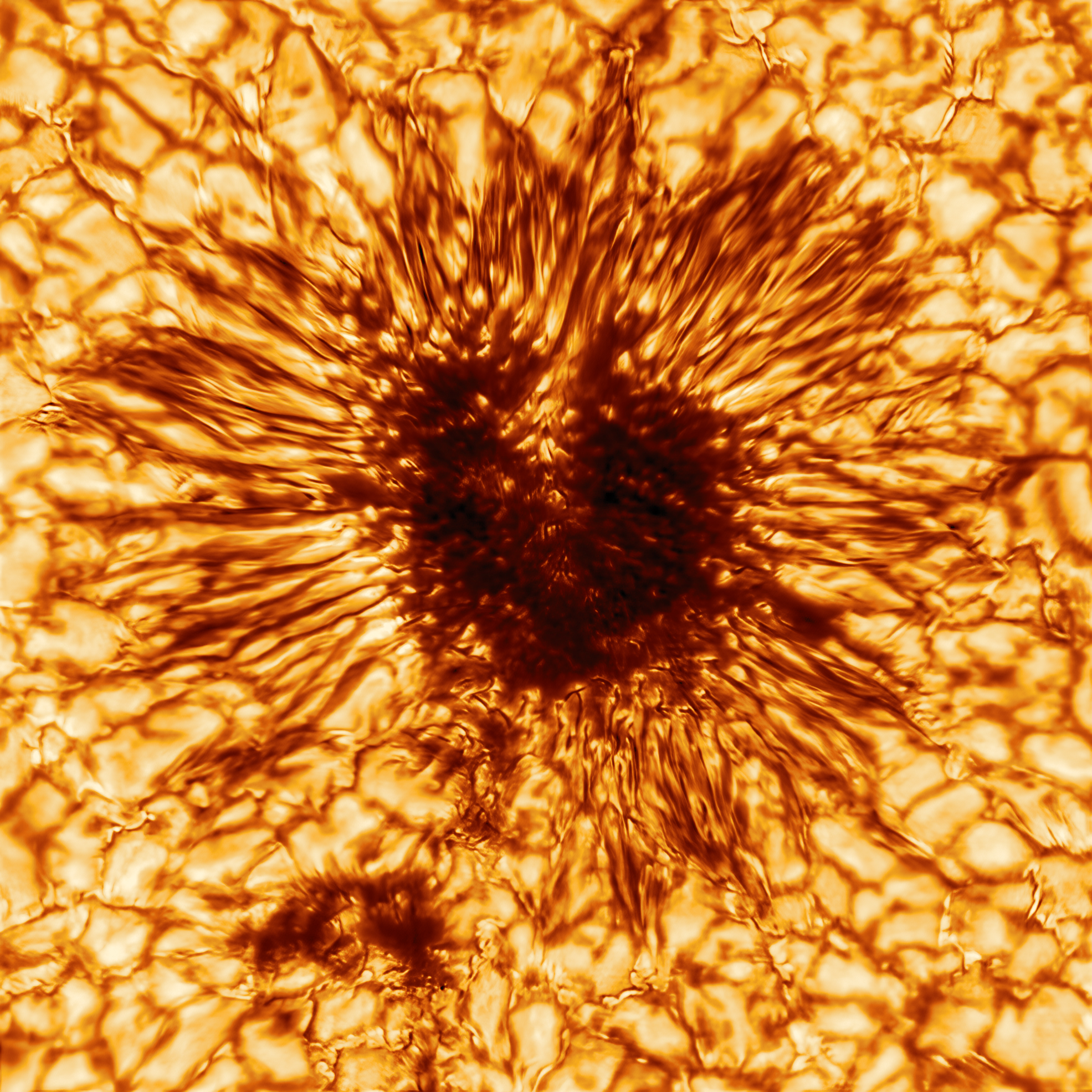
High-resolution image of a sunspot taken by the DKIST

DKIST is expected to have five first-generation instruments.

=== Visible Broadband Imager (VBI) ===
The VBI is a diffraction-limited two-channel imager, with each path made of an interference filter and a digital scientific CMOS sensor camera that samples the image of the Sun. Each camera features 4k×4k pixels. The interference filters work as a band-pass filter that only transmits a selected wavelength range (i.e. color) of the sunlight. Four different interference filters are available in each channel that are mounted in a motorized fast-change filter wheel.

VBI blue channel (45″ field of view)

- 393.327 nm, FWHM: 0.101 nm (Ca II K spectral line, dark-violet)
- 430.520 nm, FWHM: 0.437 nm (G-band, violet)
- 450.287 nm, FWHM: 0.41 nm (blue continuum)
- 486.139 nm, FWHM: 0.0464 nm (H-beta spectral line, turquoise)

VBI red channel (69″ field of view)

- 656.282 nm, FWHM: 0.049 nm (H-alpha spectral line, light-red)
- 668.423 nm, FWHM: 0.442 nm (red continuum)
- 705.839 nm, FWHM: 0.578 nm (Titanium(II) oxide (TiO) spectral line, dark-red)
- 789.186 nm, FWHM: 0.356 nm (Fe XI spectral line)

Per wavelength, a burst of images shall be recorded with high frame rate (30 fps), digitally analyzed and formed into a single sharpened image (speckle-reconstruction).

VBI is fabricated by the National Solar Observatory.

=== Visible Spectro-Polarimeter (ViSP) ===
ViSP is fabricated by the High Altitude Observatory.

=== Visible Tunable Filter (VTF) ===
VTF is fabricated by the Kiepenheuer-Institut für Sonnenphysik.

=== Diffraction-Limited Near-InfraRed Spectro-Polarimeter (DL-NIRSP) ===
DL-NIRSP is a diffraction grating based integral field spectrograph with a spectral resolution R=250000. DL-NIRSP is fabricated by Institute for Astronomy (IfA) of the University of Hawaii.

=== Cryogenic Near-InfraRed Spectro-Polarimeter (Cryo-NIRSP) ===
Cryo-NIRSP is fabricated by Institute for Astronomy (IfA) of the University of Hawaii.

== Partners ==
As of 2014, twenty-two institutions had joined the collaboration building DKIST:

- Corporate Office: Association of Universities for Research in Astronomy
- Funding Agency: National Science Foundation
- Principal Investigator: National Solar Observatory
- Co-Principal Investigators:
  - High Altitude Observatory
  - New Jersey Institute of Technology
  - Institute for Astronomy, University of Hawaii
  - Department of Astronomy and Astrophysics and Department of Mathematics, University of Chicago
- Collaborators:
  - Air Force Research Laboratory
  - Bellan Plasma Group, Laboratories of Applied Physics, California Institute of Technology
  - Department of Physics and Astronomy, California State University at Northridge
  - Colorado Research Associates
  - Center for Astrophysics | Harvard & Smithsonian
  - Kiepenheuer-Institut für Sonnenphysik, Freiburg, Germany
  - Lockheed Martin Solar and Astrophysics Laboratory
  - Department of Physics and Astronomy, Michigan State University
  - Department of Physics, Montana State University
  - NASA Goddard Space Flight Center
  - NASA Marshall Space Flight Center
  - Plasma Physics Laboratory, Princeton University
  - Instrumentation and Space Research Division, Southwest Research Institute
  - W.W. Hansen Experimental Physics Laboratory, Stanford University
  - University of California Los Angeles
  - Center for Astrophysics and Space Sciences, University of California, San Diego
  - Center for Astrophysics and Space Astronomy and Joint Institute for Laboratory Astrophysics, University of Colorado at Boulder
  - Department of Physics and Astronomy, University of Rochester

== Solar Orbiter and Daniel K. Inouye Solar Telescope collaboration ==
Solar Orbiter and the Daniel K. Inouye Solar Telescope (DKIST) are two of the facilities available to the solar physics community, providing observations with the highest spatial resolution from space and ground, respectively. The first coordinated observations of the Sun by these two facilities occurred between 18 and 24 October 2022. The aim of these initial coordinated observations was to demonstrate how such high-resolution, joint observations—along with similar campaigns—can help address important scientific questions in the field. Coordinated data were successfully collected at several times throughout the week, enabling studies of coronal loop physics, the formation and evolution of small-scale active region brightenings, and coronal rain dynamics.

== See also ==
- Daniel K. Inouye International Airport
- European Solar Telescope
- List of solar telescopes
- List of largest optical reflecting telescopes
