= Daocheng Solar Radio Telescope =

Solar radio telescope in Sichuan, China

DSRT location in the Sichuan province

Daocheng Solar Radio Telescope (DSRT) is a radio telescope in China, that started its operations in 2023 and is used for solar astronomy. It consists of 313 parabolic antennas of 6-meter diameter each, that form an interferometric array. Antennas are equally spaced and form a circle with a circumference of 3.14 km. At the center of the circle is 100-meters-high calibration antenna. The telescope operation frequencies are between 150 MHz and 450 MHz for detection of coronal mass ejection events. The telescope is located in the mountains on Qinghai-Tibetan Plateau in the Sichuan province, and is operated by the Chinese Meridian Space Weather Monitoring Project II. As of 2023, it is the largest solar telescope in operation. Its construction began in 2021 and was finished in 2022. The operations began in June 2023.
