= Radio Solar Telescope Network =

The Radio Solar Telescope Network (RSTN) is a network of solar observatories maintained and operated by the 557th Weather Wing, ACC. The RSTN consists of ground-based observatories in Australia, Italy, Massachusetts, and Hawaii.

== History ==
It became apparent in the early 1960s that certain space weather events might interfere with the stated U.S. objective of a crewed mission to the moon. In particular, the sun emits continuous electromagnetic energy and electrically charged particles, which can cause disturbances in the near-Earth environment and disrupt satellite communications.

Foremost among these concerns was the possibility of a geomagnetic storm of solar origin. Metric Type II radio bursts, signatures of coronal shock waves or coronal mass ejections, were known to be commonly associated with solar flares. The United States Air Force Research Laboratory (AFRL) was thus assigned the task of developing and validating a network of ground-based solar observatories. AFRL established a worldwide network of sweep frequency recorders from which estimates of the shock speed in the corona could be made. This network, called the Radio Solar Telescope Network (RSTN), uses a bandwidth from 25 MHz to 85 MHz. RSTN also makes fixed-frequency observations extending into the mm wavelength range: [0.245, 0.41, 0.61, 1.415, 2.695, 4.995, and 8.8 GHz], an excellent set for monitoring the gradual development of solar magnetic activity and solar flares.

The prototype was assembled and operated at the Sagamore Hill Solar Radio Observatory during the early 1960s. The Sagamore Hill Solar Radio Observatory began operating solar patrols in 1966. The Air Force Geophysics Laboratory (AFGL, currently Phillips Lab) transferred operation of the observatory to Detachment 2 of the 2nd Weather Group of the Air Force Weather Agency in October 1978. However, Phillips Lab continues to work in an advisory capacity to the observatory.

== Mission ==
The mission of the solar observatories of the RSTN is to monitor solar flares, noise storms and other releases of energy from the sun, and when necessary, notify military and civilian personnel concerned with space, weather, power and communications in countries throughout the world. These routine observations also have supported many purely scientific investigations for various purposes in solar physics.

== Operations ==
The radio and optical observatories are operated by detachments of the 2nd Weather Group, as follows:

- Det. 1, Learmonth Solar Observatory, RAAF Learmonth, WA, Australia
- Det. 2, Sagamore Hill Solar Observatory, Hamilton, Massachusetts, USA
- Det. 4, Holloman AFB, New Mexico, USA
- Det. 5, Kaena Point Solar Observatory, Kaena Point, Hawaii, USA
- San Vito Solar Observatory, San Vito dei Normanni, Italy

The RSTN is complemented in its real-time capability by a radio telescope operated from 25 MHz (the ionospheric cutoff) to 1,800 MHz by the Ionospheric Prediction Service at the Paul Wild Observatory in Culgoora, New South Wales, Australia.
