= Mercator Telescope =

Telescope in La Palma, Canary Islands; focused on exoplanet research

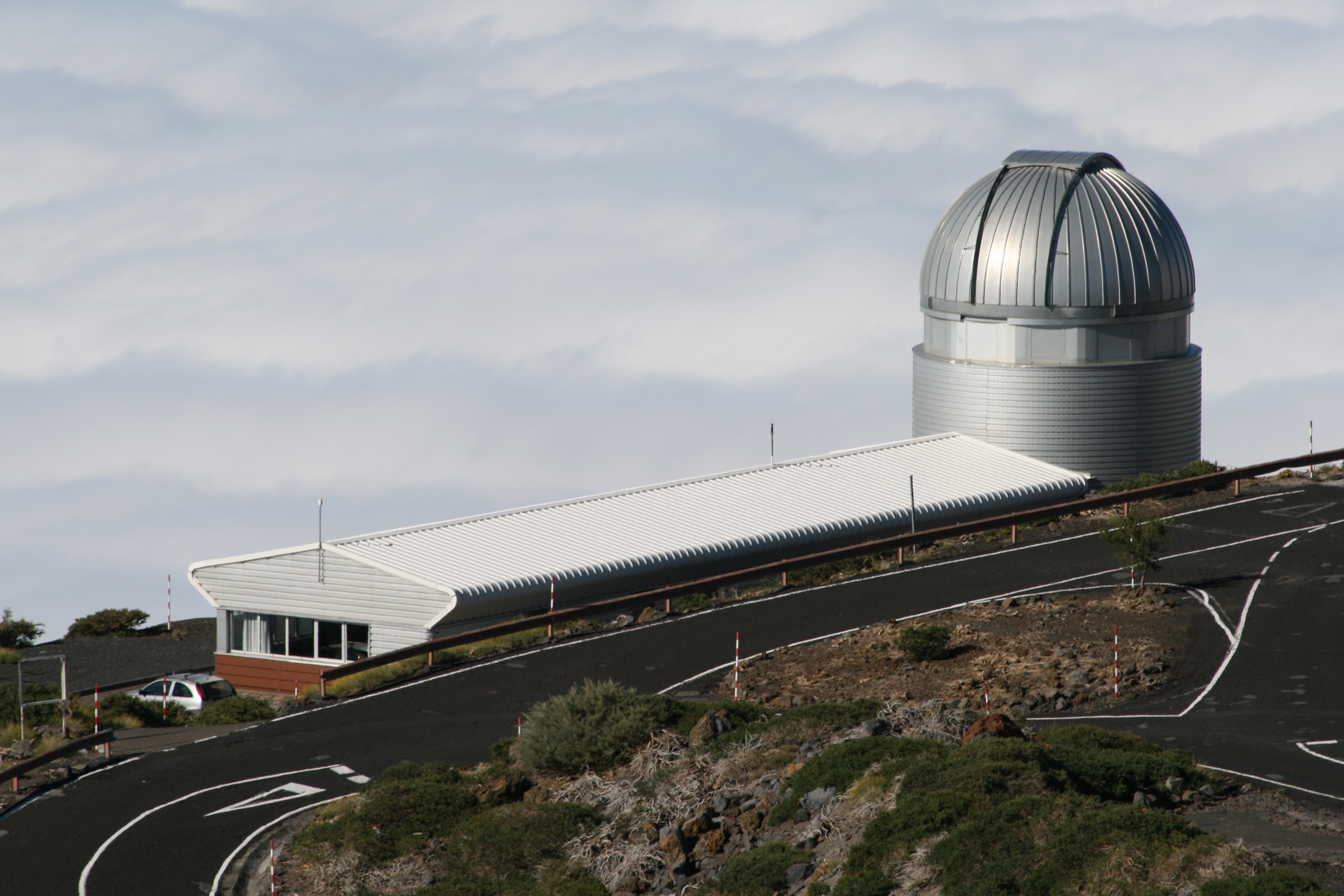
- The Mercator Telescope as seen from the top of the Swedish Solar Telescope.
- Location(s): La Palma, Atlantic Ocean, international waters
- Coordinates: 28°45′43″N 17°52′39″W
- Diameter: 1.2 m (3 ft 11 in)
- Location within Canary Islands
- Related media on Commons

The Mercator Telescope is a 1.2 m telescope at the Observatorio del Roque de Los Muchachos on La Palma. It is operated by the Katholieke Universiteit Leuven (Leuven University), Belgium, in collaboration with the Observatory of the University of Geneva and named after Gerard Mercator, famous cartographer.

The telescope was completed in the year 2000 for an exoplanet research program.

== Features ==
The telescope contains two different measuring devices. First of all, there is the MeropeII CCD camera. This camera has a size of 2k by 6k pixels Frame Transfer detector originally designed for ESA's canceled Eddington space mission. The filters used together with this camera are according to the so-called geneva photometric system. The second instrument on the Mercator Telescope is the HERMES echelle spectrograph. It covers a wavelength range between 380 and 875 nm with a spectral resolution of R~85000.

The P7 photometer was active from May 2001 until July 2008. The photometer measured in the 7 band Geneva photometric system. It measured the star in one channel and the sky in another so that the sky can be subtracted. The filter wheel is turning at a rate of 4 Hz, changing between the filters of the photometric system.

The Swiss Euler 1.2m Telescope and the Mercator Telescope were part of the Southern Sky extrasolar Planet search Programme which has discovered numerous extrasolar planets.

The Hermes spectrograph was used to monitor the Star Delta Cephei in the 2010s. The data seemed to suggest a previously unknown stellar companion. The Hermes spectrograph for Mercator was in development from at least 2004, and is a "high-resolution fiber-fed echelle spectrograph" type of design.

In 2012, the MAIA instrument for astroseismology was installed. MAIA, also called the Mercator Advanced Imager for Astroseismology uses CCD to image in three passbands. Some of the technology was developed for a space telescope called the Eddington mission, which was however cancelled and thus not sent into space at that time.

== See also ==
- Gran Telescopio Canarias
- Nordic Optical Telescope
- Swedish Solar Telescope
- List of largest optical telescopes in the 20th century
