= WASP-24b =

Hot Jupiter exoplanet orbiting WASP-24

Discovery
- Discovered by: Street et al.
- Discovery site: La Silla/ORM
- Discovery date: April 13, 2010
- Detection method: Doppler spectroscopy

Orbital characteristics
- Epoch J2000
- Semi-major axis: 0.0359 AU (5,370,000 km)
- Orbital period (sidereal): 2.3412083 d
- Inclination: 83.64
- Star: WASP-24

Physical characteristics
- Mean radius: 1.104 R_{J}
- Mass: 1.032 M_{J}
- Mean density: 768 ^{+0.126}_{−0.096} g cm^{−3}
- Temperature: 1660 ^{+44}_{−42}

WASP-24b is a Hot Jupiter detected in the orbit of the F-type star WASP-24. The planet is approximately the same size and mass of Jupiter, but it orbits at approximately 4% of the mean distance between the Earth and the Sun every two days. WASP-24b was observed by SuperWASP starting in 2008; after two years of observations, follow-ups led to the collection of the information that led to the planet's discovery.

== Discoveries ==
Between March 5, 2008, and March 9, 2009, WASP-24 was under the observation of both the Northern and Southern branches of the SuperWASP project, a ground-based consortium aiming to discover planets that transit (cross in front of) their host stars with respect to Earth. 9,750 data points were collected for the light curve; the star was flagged as host to possible transit events, prompting a team of astronomers from Europe and the United States to conduct follow-up observations.

The Fibre-Fed Echelle Spectrograph (FIES) on the Roque de los Muchachos Observatory's Nordic Optical Telescope provided radial velocity measurements for the system; additional calibrations during the observational period also provided the spectrum of the star. Ten Doppler spectroscopy observations were collected between December 31, 2008, and April 10, 2009. Follow-ups between January 29, 2009, and July 26, 2009, were conducted using the CORALIE spectrograph on the Leonhard Euler Telescope at La Silla Observatory, broadening knowledge of the star's spectrum, and collecting additional radial velocity measurements. These observations revealed that a body of planetary mass was orbiting the star. Analysis of the data led to the rejection of other false positive scenarios, and later, to the confirmation of the planet WASP-24b.

Because of the star's position in the sky, WASP-24 was visible to both the Faulkes Telescope North on Maui and the Faulkes Telescope South in Australia. The telescopes were used to observe the star's light, thereby detecting times when WASP-24b might have transited its star. The Faulkes telescopes collected data on two complete transits and one partial one. During this period, a nearby eclipsing binary star called N1 was considered and avoided to avoid contaminating the collected light samples.

Information collected by the Faulkes telescopes was extrapolated to reveal the characteristics of the star, and from there of the planet. The planet's discoverers compared it to HD 189733 b, which resembles WASP-24b in orbit length, mass, and radius. The planet's discovery was first reported on the SuperWASP website.

== Host star ==
WASP-24 is a F-type star located 340 parsecs (1,100 light years) away. The star is an estimated 1.129 times the mass of the Sun. WASP-24 is also 1.147 times the radius of the star, making the star both larger and more massive than the Sun. WASP-24 has an effective temperature of 6100 K, hotter than the Sun. WASP-24 has a metallicity similar to that measured in the Sun. The star's estimated age is 3.8 billion years old, although the star's age is not well-constrained.

WASP-24 has an apparent magnitude of 11.3. It cannot be seen from Earth with the naked eye.

== Characteristics ==
WASP-24b is a Hot Jupiter that has a mass of 1.032 times the mass of Jupiter. Its radius is 1.104 times the radius of Jupiter. In addition, with a mean distance of 0.0359 AU between it and its star, where one AU is the average distance between the Earth and the Sun, WASP-24b completes an orbit every 2.3412083 days (roughly 57 hours). In comparison, Mercury orbits the Sun every 87.97 days at a distance of 0.387 AU.

WASP-24b's orbital inclination is 83.64º, placing WASP-24b almost edge-on with respect to Earth and to its host star.

The study in 2012, utilizing a Rossiter–McLaughlin effect, have determined the planetary orbit is well aligned with the equatorial plane of the star, misalignment equal to -4.7±4°.
