= WASP-24 =

Star in the constellation of Virgo

Observation data Epoch J2000 Equinox ICRS
- Constellation: Virgo
- Right ascension: 15^{h} 08^{m} 51.7367^{s}
- Declination: +02° 20′ 35.962″
- Apparent magnitude (V): 11.3

Characteristics
- Evolutionary stage: main sequence
- Spectral type: F8/9

Astrometry
Radial velocity (R_{v})	−17.46±0.58 km/s
Proper motion (μ)	RA: −16.741 mas/yr Dec.: −8.556 mas/yr
Parallax (π)	3.0330±0.0208 mas
Distance	1,075 ± 7 ly (330 ± 2 pc)

Details
Mass	1.184±0.027 M_{☉}
Radius	1.331±0.032 R_{☉}
Surface gravity (log g)	4.26 ± 0.02 cgs
Temperature	6107 ± 77 K
Metallicity [Fe/H]	–0.02 ± 0.10 dex
Rotational velocity (v sin i)	7.32 ± 0.88 km/s
Age	3.8^{+1.3}_{−1.2} Gyr

Other designations
- TOI-5685, TIC 460396820, WASP-24, TYC 339-329-1, 2MASS J15085174+0220358, USNO-B1.0 0923-0348089

Database references
SIMBAD	data
Exoplanet Archive	data

WASP-24 is an F-type star with the hot Jupiter planet WASP-24b in orbit, about 1,075 light-years away in the constellation Virgo. WASP-24 is slightly larger and more massive than the Sun, it also has a similar metallicity and is hotter than the Sun. WASP-24 was first observed by the SuperWASP planet-searching organization, which flagged it as a potential host to a planet before following up with radial velocity and spectral measurements. Analysis of these confirmed the planetary nature of WASP-24b, which was later released to the public on the SuperWASP website.

An eclipsing binary pair of companion stars were identified by a 2019 study using Gaia DR2 data. They are separated by 21.8 arcseconds from the primary star, corresponding to a distance of 7097 AU.

== Observational history ==
Between March 2008 and April 2009, the northern and southern portions of the SuperWASP Consortium observed the night sky in WASP-24's vicinity. The star, in particular, was flagged as a host to a planetary candidate. After accumulating over 9,750 datapoints for a light curve on WASP-24, all information on the star that had been previously catalogued was collected alongside the new data, and the star was set aside for manual follow-up observations.

The 2.56m Nordic Optical Telescope (NOT) at the Canary Islands' Roque de los Muchachos Observatory was used to collected radial velocity measurements. The Fibre-Fed Echelle Spectrograph, or FIES, was the instrument that collected these observations between December 2008 and April 2009; also used was the CORALIE spectrograph on the Leonhard Euler Telescope at Chile's La Silla Observatory, which collected additional radial velocity and spectral measurements. Analysis of WASP-24's spectrum ruled out the possibility that WASP-24 is a rapidly rotating star, which could make confirmation of a planet difficult, or that it is a spectroscopic binary star system. Use of a span bisector analysis revealed that the star is not very active. WASP-24 was then observed using Hawaii's Faulkes Telescope North and Australia's Faulkes Telescope South, searching for a period at which the discovered planet WASP-24b might transit, or cross in front of, its star, over various days in 2009 and 2010.

Using information collected by NOT, WASP-24's temperature, metallicity, and other characteristics were derived. Detected levels of lithium and the star's surface gravity suggests that the star does not follow the main sequence. These stellar characteristics were later used to derive its planet's characteristics.

WASP-24 and, specifically, the discovery of orbiting hot Jupiter WASP-24b were first reported on SuperWASP's website in April 2010, followed by its formal publication in September 2010.

== Characteristics ==
WASP-24 is an F-type star that lies 330 parsecs, or 1,075 light years, away. With an apparent magnitude of 11.3, the star is invisible to the naked eye from the Earth's perspective. WASP-24 is 1.129 solar masses and 1.147 solar radii, making it just slightly larger and more massive than the Sun. It is also hotter, with an effective temperature of 6100 K. The star has a metallicity similar to that of the sun, which means that it has the same amount of metals (elements heavier than He) as found in the Sun. The best fit for WASP-24's age is 3.8 billion years, although this is not well-constrained, and its actual age may lie anywhere between 2.6 and 5.1 billion years.

The star's surface gravity, logg = 4.15, and its low levels of lithium helped derive the star's age, and revealed that it most likely evolved away from the zero age main sequence.

== Planetary system ==
WASP-24b is a hot Jupiter that is 1.091 Jupiter masses and 1.383 Jupiter radii. Thus, the planet is larger and slightly more massive than Jupiter is. WASP-24b orbits at a distance of 0.03619 AU, roughly 3.5% of the mean distance between the Earth and Sun. It is the only planet yet discovered to orbit WASP-24.

The WASP-24 planetary system
Companion (in order from star)	Mass	Semimajor axis (AU)	Orbital period (days)	Eccentricity	Inclination (°)	Radius
b	1.091 ± 0.025 M_{J}	0.03619 ± 0.00027	2.3412132 ± 0.0000018	<0.0388	83.30 ± 0.30	1.383 ± 0.039 R_{J}
