= Delta Cephei =

Binary star system in the constellation Cepheus

δ Cephei
- Location of δ Cep (circled)

Observation data Epoch J2000 Equinox ICRS
- Constellation: Cepheus
- δ Cep A
- Right ascension: 22^{h} 29^{m} 10.26502^{s}
- Declination: +58° 24′ 54.7139″
- Apparent magnitude (V): 3.48–4.37
- δ Cep C
- Right ascension: 22^{h} 29^{m} 09.248^{s}
- Declination: +58° 24′ 14.76″
- Apparent magnitude (V): 6.3

Characteristics
- Spectral type: F5Ib-G1Ib + B8IV
- U−B color index: 0.36
- B−V color index: 0.60
- Variable type: Cepheid

Astrometry
Radial velocity (R_{v})	−17.28±0.08 km/s
Proper motion (μ)	RA: +15.35 mas/yr Dec.: +3.52 mas/yr
Parallax (π)	3.66±0.10 mas
Distance	890 ± 20 ly (273 ± 7 pc)
Absolute magnitude (M_{V})	−3.47±0.10 (−3.94 to −3.05)

Orbit
Primary	δ Cep Aa
Secondary	δ Cep Ab
Period (P)	9.32+0.03 −0.04 years
Semi-major axis (a)	0.029+0.002 −0.003″
Eccentricity (e)	0.71±0.02
Inclination (i)	124+17 −12°
Longitude of the node (Ω)	78+56 −50°
Periastron epoch (T)	1982.294+0.111 −0.101
Argument of periastron (ω) (secondary)	230+4 −3°
Semi-amplitude (K_{1}) (primary)	1.509±0.2 km/s

Details

δ Cep Aa
Mass	5.26+1.26 −1.4 M_{☉}
Radius	41.2–45.3 (Note: Calculated using an angular diameter of 272 parsecs and a varying angular diameter between 1.409 and 1.55 mas: 0.1075 • 1.409 • 272 = 41.2 R_{☉}; 0.1075 • 1.55 • 272 = 45.3 R_{☉}, where 0.1075 converts arcseconds into milliarcseconds and astronomical units into R_{☉}.) R_{☉}
Luminosity	1,949±107 L_{☉}
Surface gravity (log g)	1.81–1.91 cgs
Temperature	5,499–6,595 K
Metallicity [Fe/H]	+0.08 dex
Rotational velocity (v sin i)	9 km/s
Age	100–130 Myr

δ Cep Ab
Mass	0.72±0.11 M_{☉}
Age	100–130 Myr

δ Cep Ca
Mass	4.78 M_{☉}
Radius	5.25 R_{☉}
Luminosity	248 L_{☉}
Surface gravity (log g)	4.31 cgs
Temperature	11,161 K
Metallicity [Fe/H]	−0.42 dex
Rotational velocity (v sin i)	24.8 km/s
Age	112 Myr

δ Cep Cb
Mass	1.99 M_{☉}

Other designations
- Delta Cep, CCDM J22292+5825AC, WDS J22292+5825AB
- A: 27 Cephei, BD+57 2548, FK5 847, HD 213306, HIP 110991, HR 8571, SAO 34508
- C: BD+57 2547, HD 213307, HIP 110988, SAO 34506

Database references
SIMBAD	data
- C

Delta Cephei is a quadruple star system in the northern constellation of Cepheus, the King. Its name is a Bayer designation that is Latinized from δ Cephei, and abbreviated Delta Cep or δ Cep. Based on parallax measurements, it is located approximately 890 light-years away from Earth. At this distance, the visual magnitude of the star is diminished by 0.23 as a result of extinction caused by gas and dust along the line of sight. It is the prototype of the Cepheid variable stars that undergo periodic changes in luminosity.

== Discovery ==
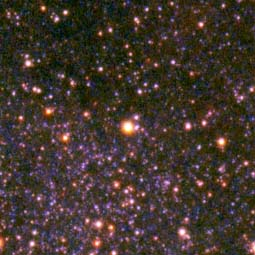
Image of Delta Cephei, in the center

Delta Cephei was discovered to be variable by John Goodricke during 1784. He describes his first observation on October 19, 1784, followed by a regular series of observations most nights until December 28. Further observations were made during the first half of 1785, the variability was described in a letter dated June 28, 1785, and formally published on January 1, 1786. This was the second variable star of this type, with Eta Aquilae being discovered just a few weeks earlier, on September 10, 1784.

== Properties ==
As well as being the prototype of the Cepheid class of variable stars, Delta Cephei is among the closest stars of this type of variable to the Sun, with only Polaris being nearer. Its variability is caused by regular pulsations in the outer layers of the star. It varies from magnitude 3.48 to 4.37, and its stellar classification also varies, from about F5 to G3. The pulsation period is 5.366249 days, with a rise to maximum occurring quicker than the subsequent decline to minimum.

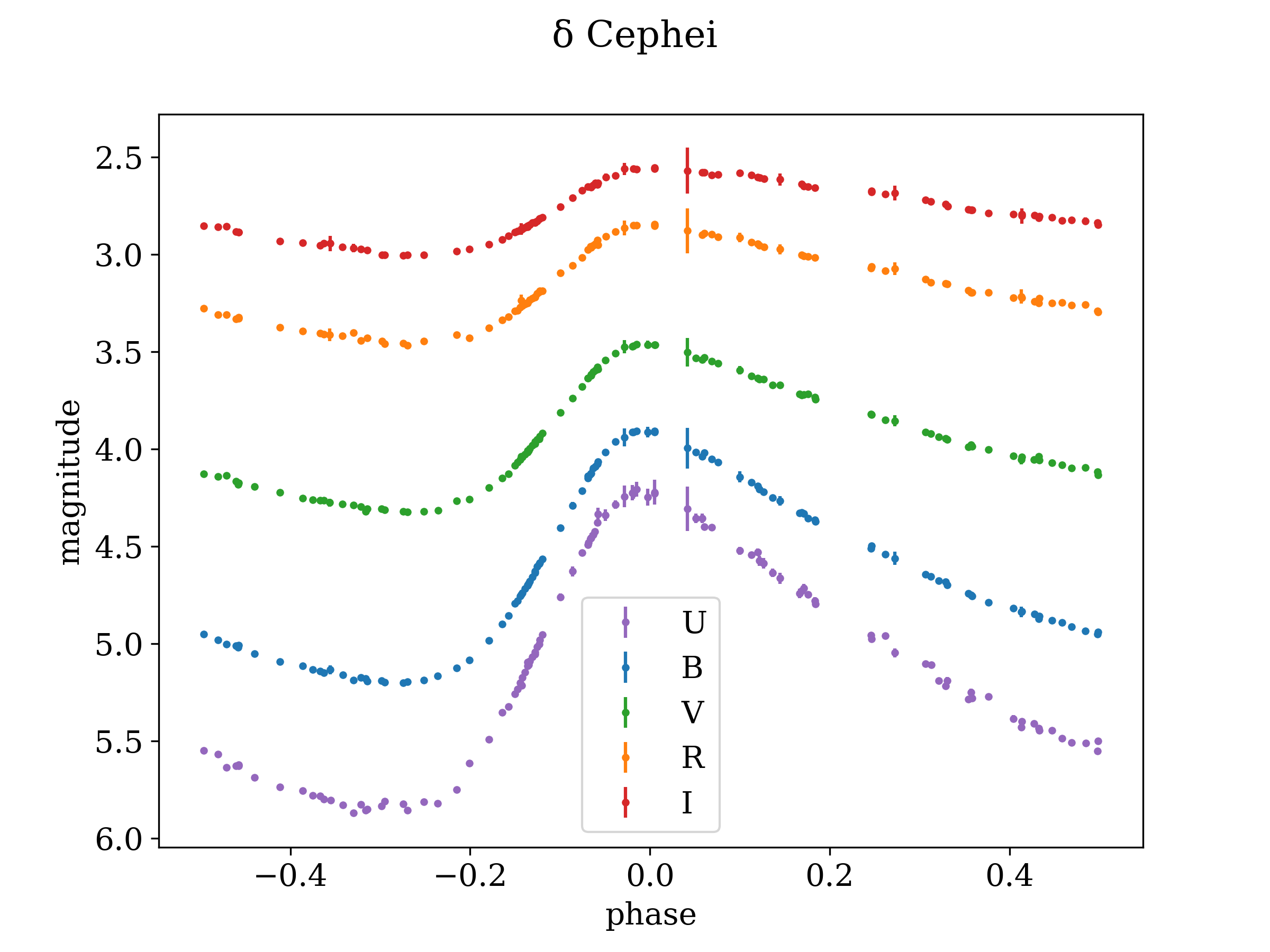
Phase-folded UBVRI light curves of Delta Cephei showing magnitude versus pulsation phase.

Because the period of this class of variable is dependent on the star's luminosity, Delta Cephei is of particular importance as a calibrator for the period–luminosity relationship, since its distance is now one of the most precisely established for a Cepheid. This accuracy is thanks in part to its membership of a star cluster and the availability of precise Hubble Space Telescope/Hipparcos parallaxes. Hence, in 2002, the Hubble Space Telescope was used to determine the distance to Delta Cephei within a 4% margin of error: 273 parsecs (890 light-years) . However, a re-analysis of Hipparcos data found a larger parallax than before, leading to a shorter distance of 244±10 pc, which is equivalent to 800 light-years.

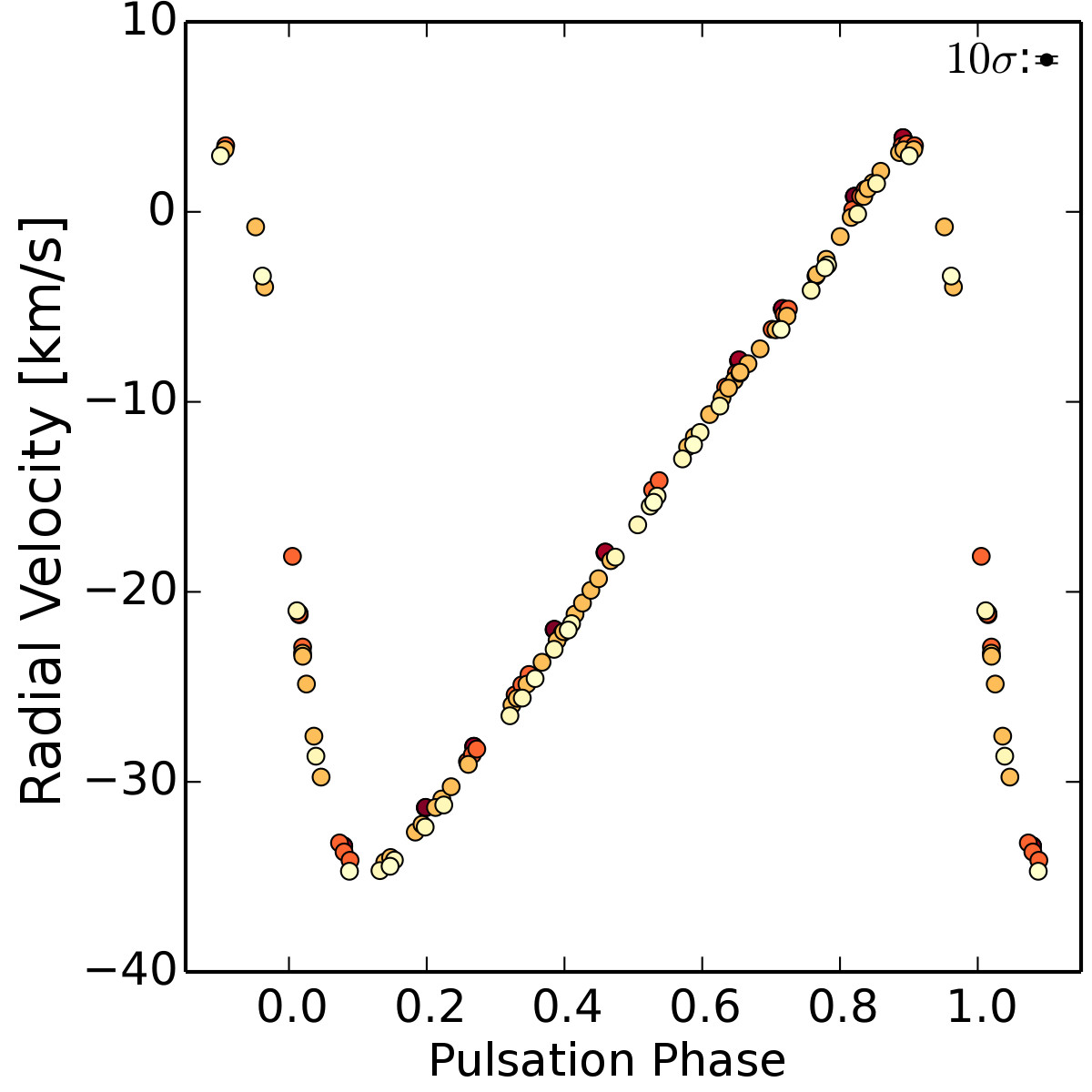
Hermes Radial Velocity Curve of Delta Cephei A. The offset between points of identical color is due to the spectroscopic companion, Delta Cephei B.

Radial velocity measurements of Delta Cephei have revealed the presence of a small spectroscopic companion star on a 6-year orbit around Delta Cephei A. The mass of this companion is about one tenth of the mass of Delta Cephei and the two come to within 2 astronomical units at pericenter passage. The presence of this companion will have to be taken into account when Gaia measures Delta Cephei's parallax (distance).

Delta Cephei has a common proper motion companion Delta Cephei C (HD 213307, sometimes referred to as component B) is also a spectroscopic and astrometric binary. The faint star listed as component B in multiple star catalogues is an unrelated background object.

Stars of this type are believed to form with masses of 3–12 times that of the Sun, and then have passed through the main sequence as B-type stars. With the hydrogen consumed in their core region, these unstable stars are now passing through later stages of nuclear burning. The star's mass has been determined spectroscopically at 5.3 times the mass of the Sun. At this stage of its evolution, the outer layers of the star have expanded to an radius which varies from 41 to 45 times that of the Sun.

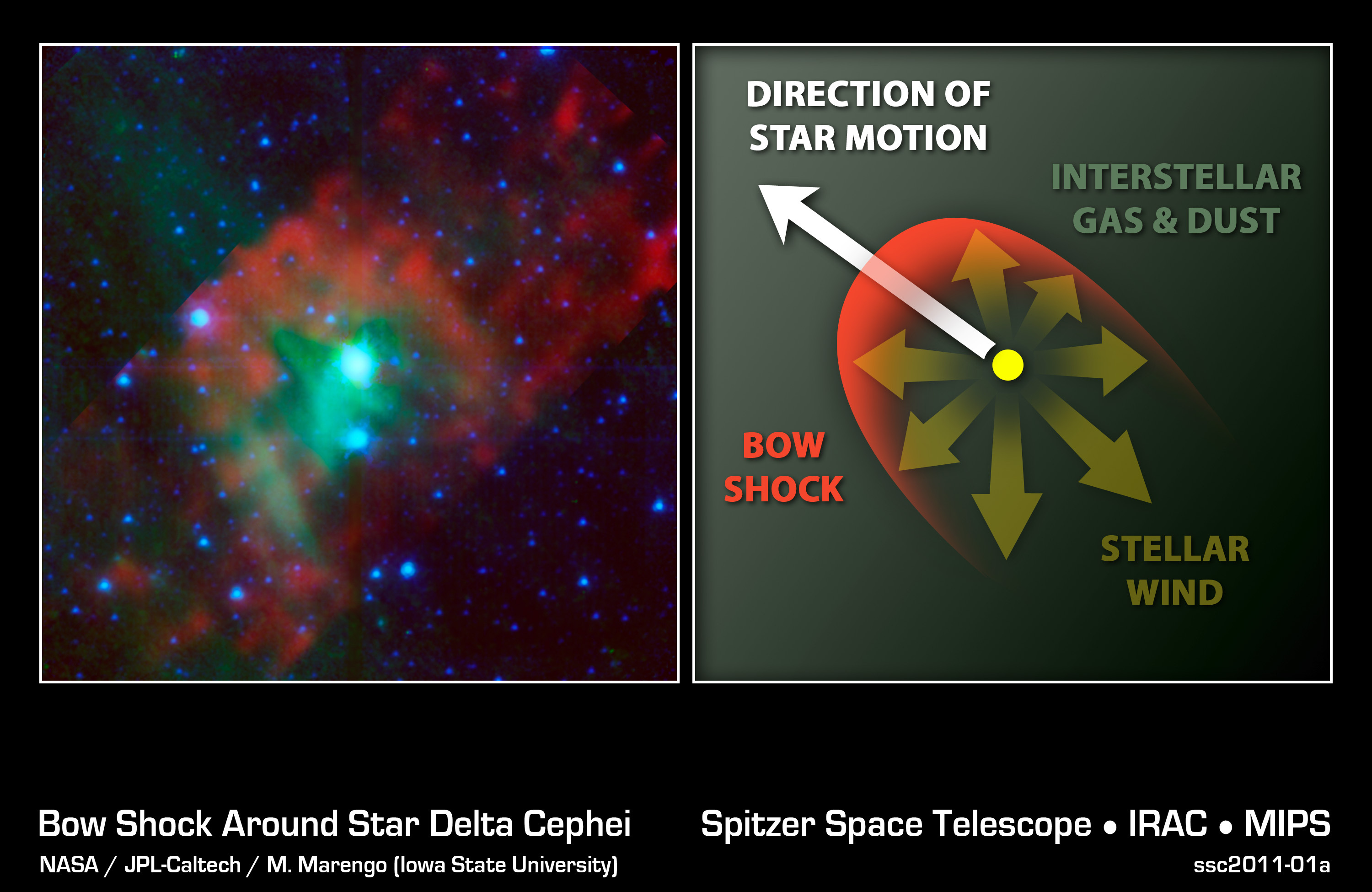
Bow shock around Delta Cephei

Delta Cephei is emitting around 1,900 times the Sun's luminosity from the outer atmosphere. This is producing a strong stellar wind, which, in combination with the pulsations and shocks in the star's atmosphere, is ejecting mass at the rate of (1.0±0.8)×10^{−6} M_{☉} per year, or the equivalent to the mass of the Sun roughly every million years. This matter is flowing outward at a velocity of about 35 km/s. The result of this expelled gas is the formation of a nebula about 1 parsec across, centered on Delta Cephei, and containing 0.07–0.21 solar masses of neutral hydrogen. A bow shock is being formed where the stellar wind is colliding with the surrounding interstellar medium.

The peculiar velocity of Delta Cephei is 13.5±2.9 km/s relative to its neighbors. It is a suspected member of the Cep OB6 star cluster, and hence may be around the same age as the cluster: around 79 million years. At an angular separation of 40 arc seconds from Delta Cephei is a magnitude 6.3 companion star with the identifier HD 213307, called component C in most multiple star catalogues, which is visible in small telescopes. HD 213307 itself is a binary star system with a combined stellar classification of B7–8 III–IV. It is heating the matter being ejected by the stellar wind of Delta Cephei, causing the surrounding circumstellar material to emit infrared radiation.
