= European Northern Observatory =

The European Northern Observatory (ENO) is the name by which the Instituto de Astrofísica de Canarias (IAC) and its observatories (the Teide Observatory on Tenerife and the Roque de los Muchachos Observatory on La Palma) are collectively known. It was established in the 1990s as part of the IAC's consolidation in that decade. Its name is a word play on the successful collaboration of the member countries in the European Southern Observatory organisation.

== See also ==
- European Southern Observatory
