= Dutch Open Telescope =

Solar telescope in the Canary Islands

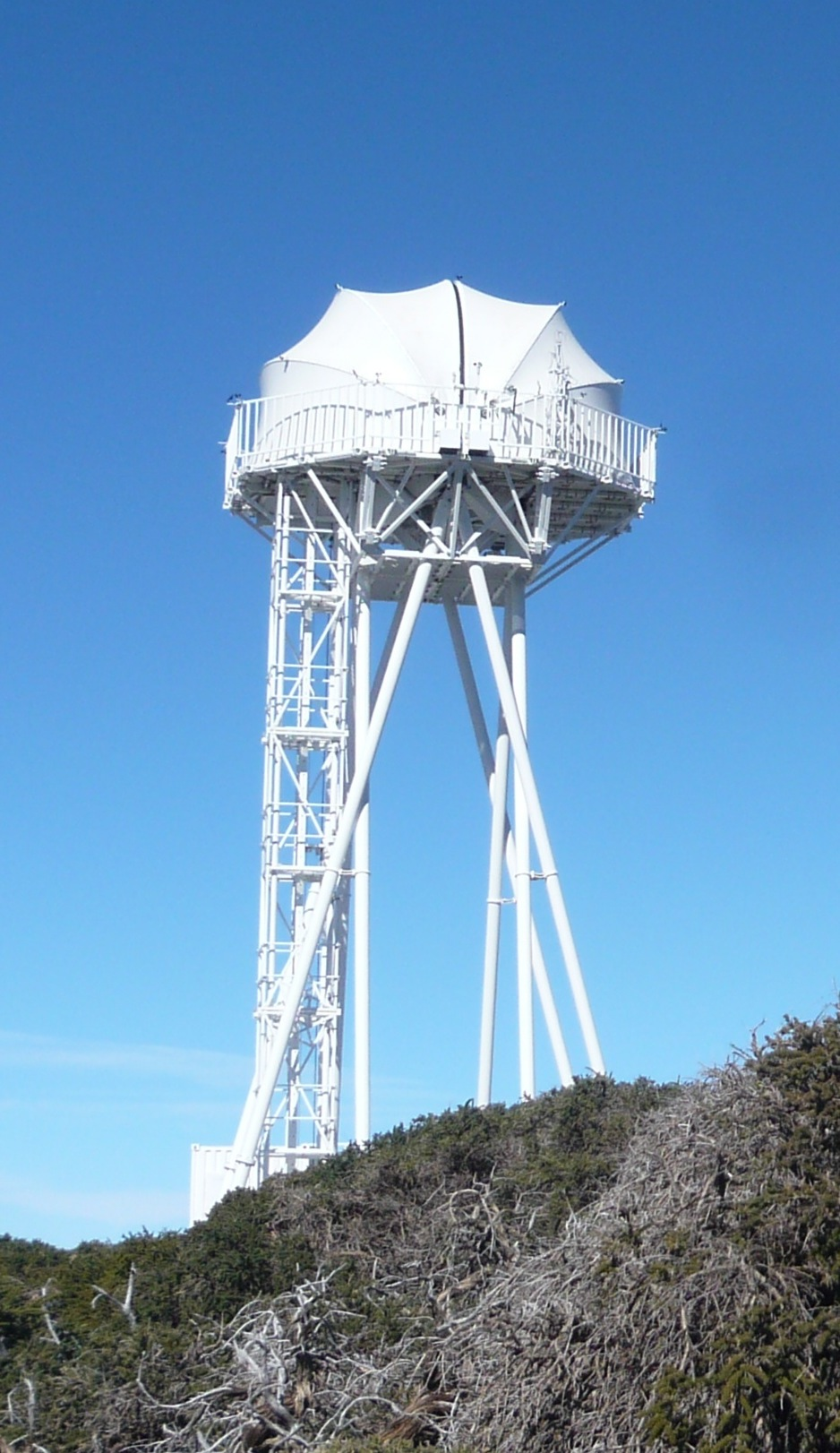
- The Dutch Open Telescope with the canopy closed.
- Part of: Roque de los Muchachos Observatory
- Location(s): La Palma, Atlantic Ocean, international waters
- Coordinates: 28°45′35″N 17°52′53″W
- Altitude: 2,350 m (7,710 ft)
- Diameter: 0.45 m (1 ft 6 in)
- Collecting area: 0.15 m^{2} (1.6 sq ft)
- Focal length: 2 m (6 ft 7 in)
- Website: www.dot.iac.es
- Location within Canary Islands
- Related media on Commons

The Dutch Open Telescope (DOT) is an optical solar telescope located on Roque de los Muchachos Observatory, La Palma (near the Swedish 1-m Solar Telescope). With a main mirror of 45 centimeters, it can reach an 0.2 arcsec resolution for sustained periods. For further optimization of the images, the DOT uses the image despeckle mechanism. It was used to record movies of the 2004 Venus transit.

The open design was a departure from vacuum-style solar telescopes, and helped pave the way for bigger solar telescopes.

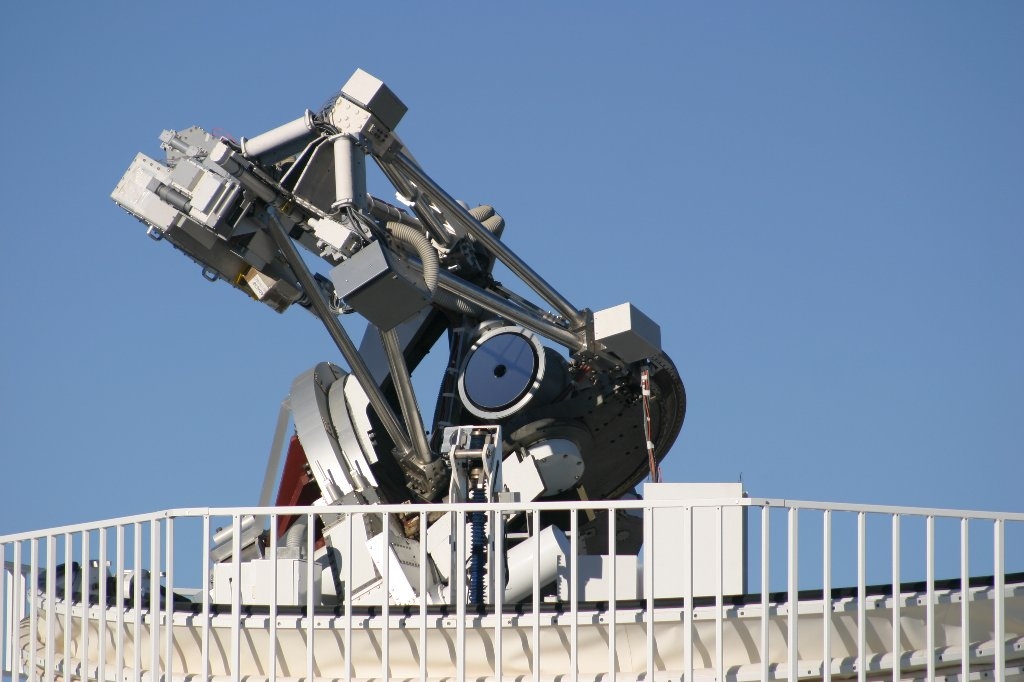
Main mirror of the DOT

== Cameras ==
The DOT has 6 cameras, each with a different filter. These filters can be used at the same time, and allows images to be taken at different wavelengths to be compared. Furthermore, some filters are tunable, allowing observers to take images at several points in the spectral lines.

== Open structure ==
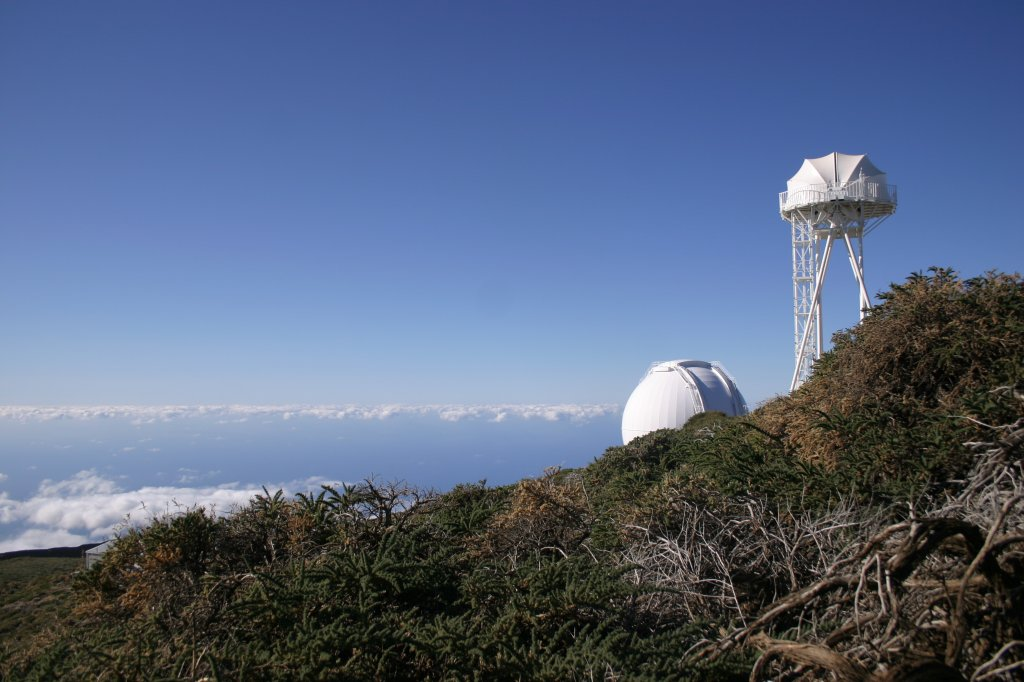
William Herschel Telescope and the DOT

The DOT is an open telescope, which means that the structure is physically open, and the wind can blow through. Because the wind blows along the mirror the air has a more or less constant temperature, and this prevents seeing. Conventional telescope designs have the problem that hot air from the ground (which is hotter due to solar heating) is blown up along the tower, and this causes air with different temperatures to blow along the telescope, which degrades the image. A drawback of this open structure is that the skeleton has to be very rigid (do not confuse with strong), to prevent the structure from moving in the wind. Normally a solid tower takes care of this (as is done with the Swedish 1-m Solar Telescope (SST), for example), or the telescope is placed inside a dome. The DOT does not have this and thus has to be very rigid. The optical part of the telescope is mounted 2 meters in front of the main mirror, and to prevent blurred images, the cameras are mounted very rigidly and can move with a precision of micrometres.

The telescope mirror can be upgraded in size to 3/4 of a meter with small modification, and even larger with additional adaptions.

== Custom designed roof ==
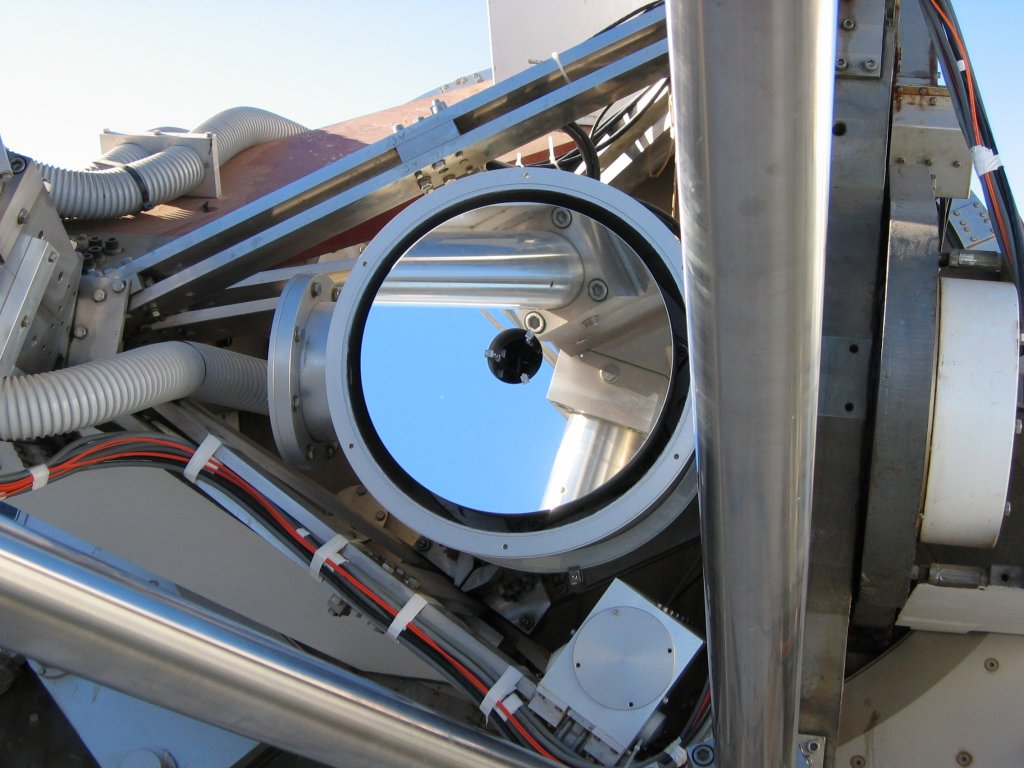
Close-up of the DOT mirror

Another novel feature of the DOT is the roof which is made of a special polymer fibre which retains its shape after being stretched and does not loosen after time. The shape of the several roof sections are made in such a way that they are always under tension when closed, so it is stronger (i.e., the sections are saddle-shaped). Patterning and test installation of this specific skin is done in cooperation with the team of Poly-Ned who made more retractable coverings for telescope structures. Example of other similar projects is GREGOR project on Tenerife. A high UV resistance PVC coated Polyester weave is important for this kind of structuresm, called Textielarchitecture in Dutch.

== Despeckle ==
The despeckle algorithm that improves the image quality allows observers to reach the diffraction limit of the telescope more often than the seeing would normally allow. The despeckle takes 100 images of the same object (e.g., a granule), but each with a temporal distance such that the atmosphere has changed drastically, but the object has not. Then by using statistics and high-powered computing (a 35 dual-Xeon computer cluster powers these despeckle algorithms) the image is improved. Before the summer of 2005, the computation took months after a day of observations, but the new cluster reduces this time to a night.

== See also ==
- List of solar telescopes
- Swedish Solar Telescope
