= HEGRA =

Former gamma-ray telescope

High-Energy-Gamma-Ray Astronomy
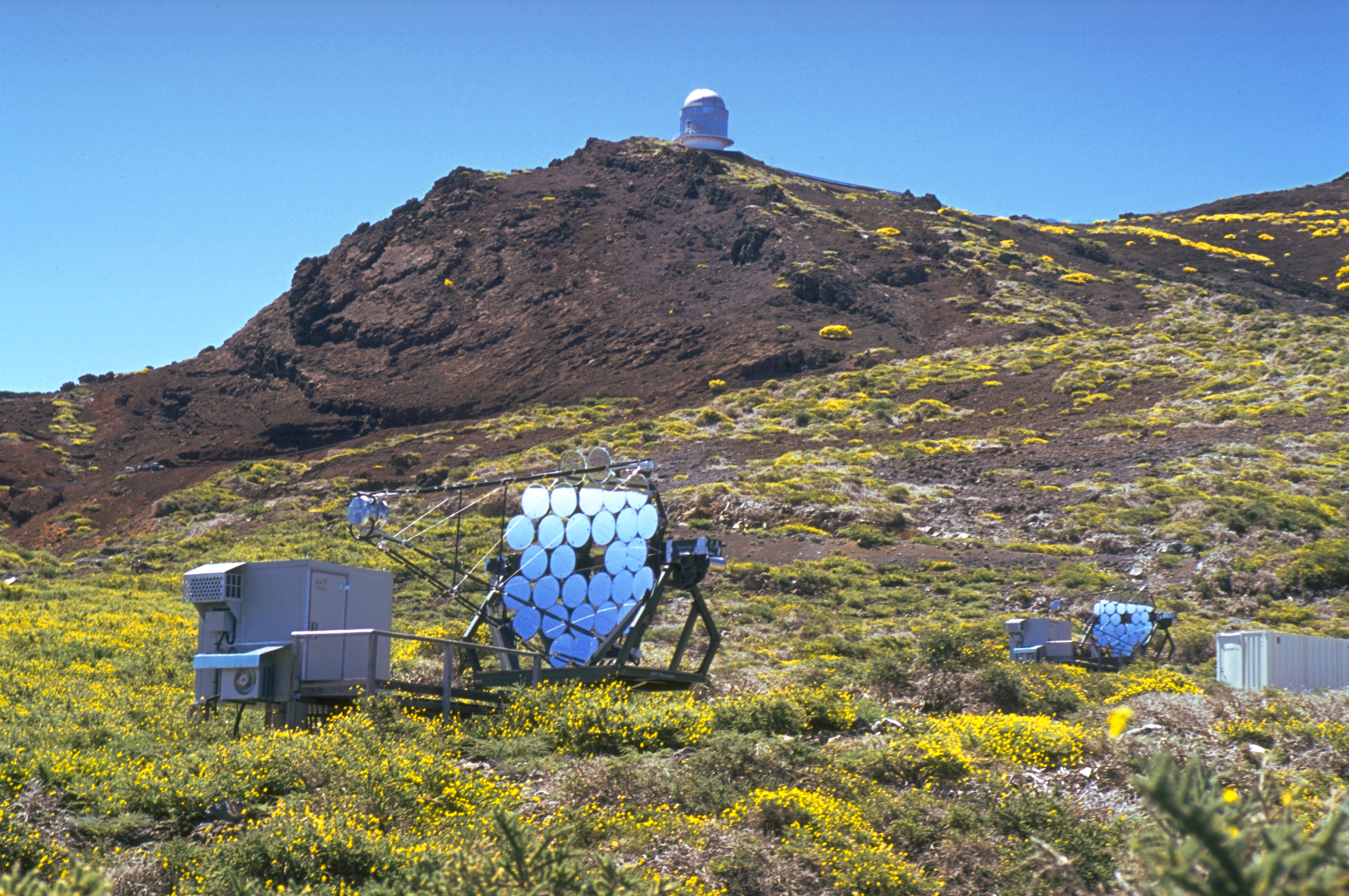
- Two HEGRA reflectors, with the Nordic Optical Telescope in the background.
- Alternative names: HEGRA
- Location(s): Garafía, Province of Santa Cruz de Tenerife, Canary Islands, Spain
- Coordinates: 28°45′42″N 17°53′27″W
- First light: 1987
- Decommissioned: September 2002
- Location within Canary Islands
- Related media on Commons

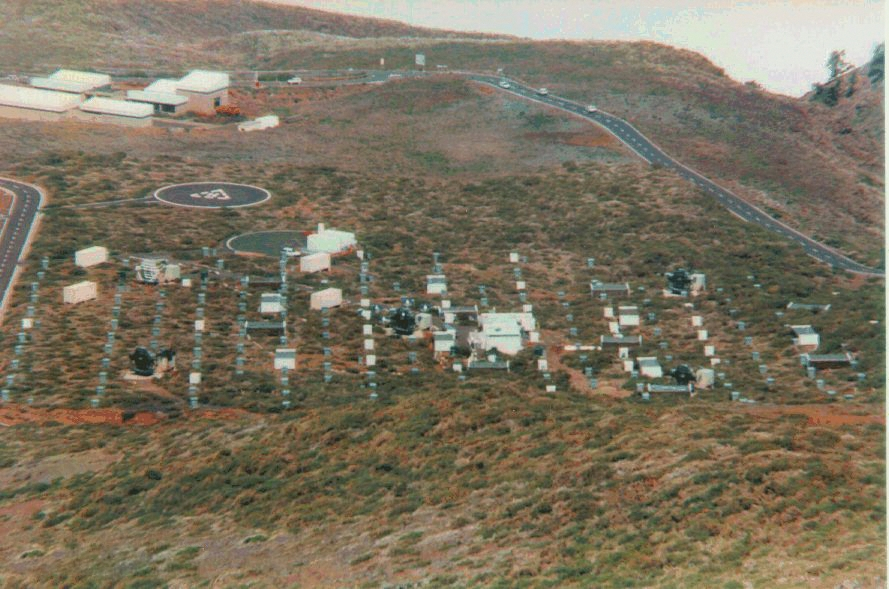
Overview of the HEGRA site in 1997

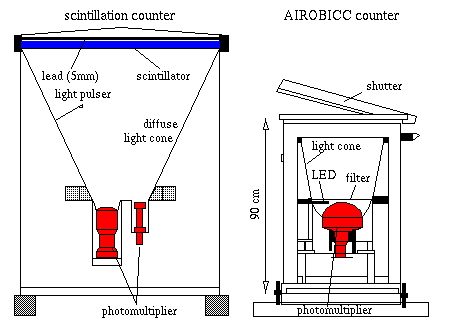
Schematic designs of the scintillation and AIROBICC counters

HEGRA, which stands for High-Energy-Gamma-Ray Astronomy, was an atmospheric Cherenkov telescope for Gamma-ray astronomy. With its various types of detectors, HEGRA took data between 1987 and 2002, at which point it was dismantled in order to build its successor, MAGIC, at the same site.

It was located at Roque de los Muchachos Observatory on La Palma at a height of 2200 m above sea level. It was operated by an international collaboration of research institutes and universities, such as the Max Planck Institute for Physics in Munich, the Universidad Complutense de Madrid, the German Max Planck Institute for Nuclear Physics, the University of Wuppertal, the IFKKI in Kiel or the University of Hamburg. It consisted of several detector types for observing secondary particles from particle cascades in the atmosphere. The particle cascades detected by HEGRA were produced by cosmic ray particles in the energy range of 10^{12} eV to 10^{16} eV.

The detectors with the lowest energy threshold were the atmospheric Cherenkov telescopes with "cameras" of photomultiplier tubes. They were sensitive to showers above 10^{12} eV (1 TeV) but had to look towards possible sources and could be operated only during clear, moonless nights. They detected Cherenkov light from relativistic secondary particles in the air showers. The field of view was about 4.6°. There were a total of six of these telescopes in operation. They were dismantled in September 2002.

The reflectors of the telescope is 3.9 meter in diameter and consisted of 30 spherical mirrors. The area of the reflector is 5 m^{2}.

Another detector type for Cherenkov light was AIROBICC (AIRshower Observation By angle Integrating Cherenkov Counters) with one large photomultiplier looking at the sky above it. 49 of these detectors were spread in a 7-by-7 grid to observe the amplitude and the time of arrival of the front of Cherenkov light. Another 48 were added later on. These counters had a wide field of view but could only be operated during clear, moonless nights, like the atmospheric Cherenkov telescopes. Their energy threshold was a few 10^{13} eV. The AIROBICC array has been dismantled.

The first detector type of HEGRA was the array of 1 m^{2} scintillation counters which were used to measure the numbers and arrival times of secondary particles in air showers arriving at ground level. More than 250 of these counters were in operation, spread over a 180-by-180 m^{2} area. These detectors were operated day and night at any weather. The energy threshold of the scintillator array was between 40 and 100 TeV, depending on the kind of primary cosmic ray particle. The scintillator array has been dismantled as well.

The scintillator array was sensitive to all types of charged secondary particles. To be able to select secondary muons in air showers there were the Muon 'Towers' with 16 m^{2} area each. Seventeen of these detectors were installed on La Palma.

There were two more types of detectors at the HEGRA site: the CRT (Cosmic Ray Tracking) and the CLUE (Cherenkov Light Ultraviolet Experiment).

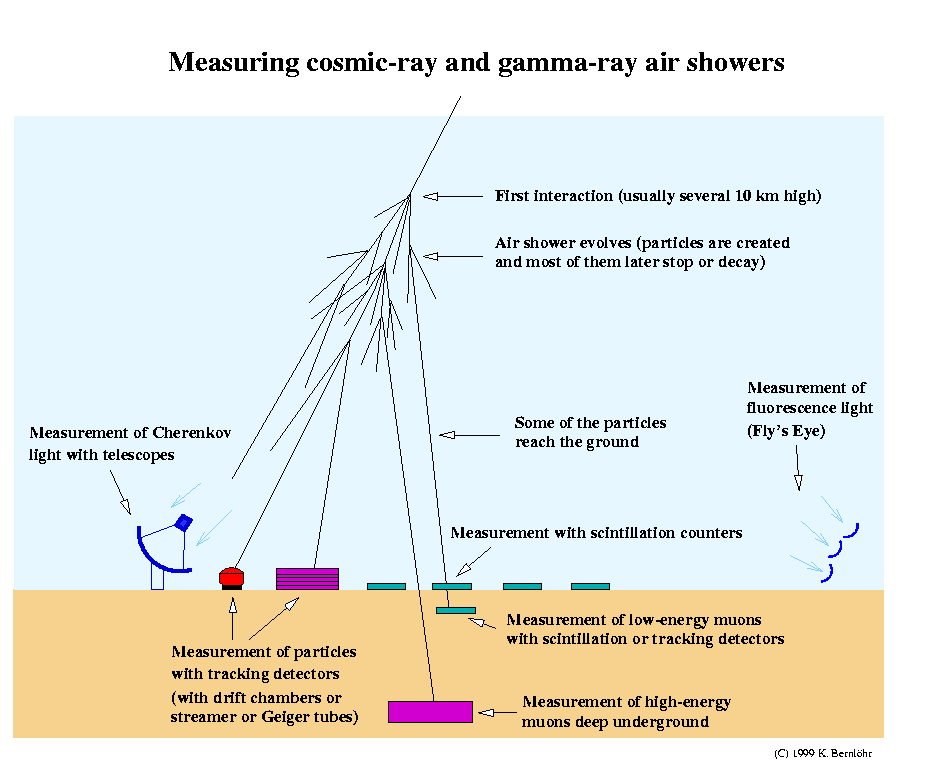
Schematic representation of cosmic ray shower detection

A remarkable achievement of the instrument was the detection of the most energetic photons observed from an extragalactic object, at 16 TeV, originating from Markarian 501 (Mrk 501).

It was shut down in 2002 in order to build the follow-up telescope MAGIC at the same site. A direct successor to the stereoscopic system of Cherenkov telescopes is the HESS experiment.

== See also ==
- The MAGIC Telescope, successor to HEGRA
