= Swedish Vacuum Solar Telescope =

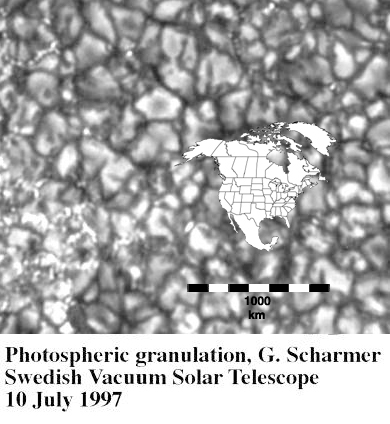
Photospheric granulation with North America overlaid for scale

The Swedish Vacuum Solar Telescope (SVST) was a 47.5-cm solar telescope on La Palma in the Canary Islands. It was removed on 28 August 2000, and has been superseded by the Swedish 1-m Solar Telescope.

The SVST awaits re-assembly by its current owner, the Chabot Space and Science Center in Oakland California, United States.

== See also ==
- Swedish Solar Telescope
- List of solar telescopes
