= Swedish Solar Telescope =

Telescope on La Plama, Canary Islands

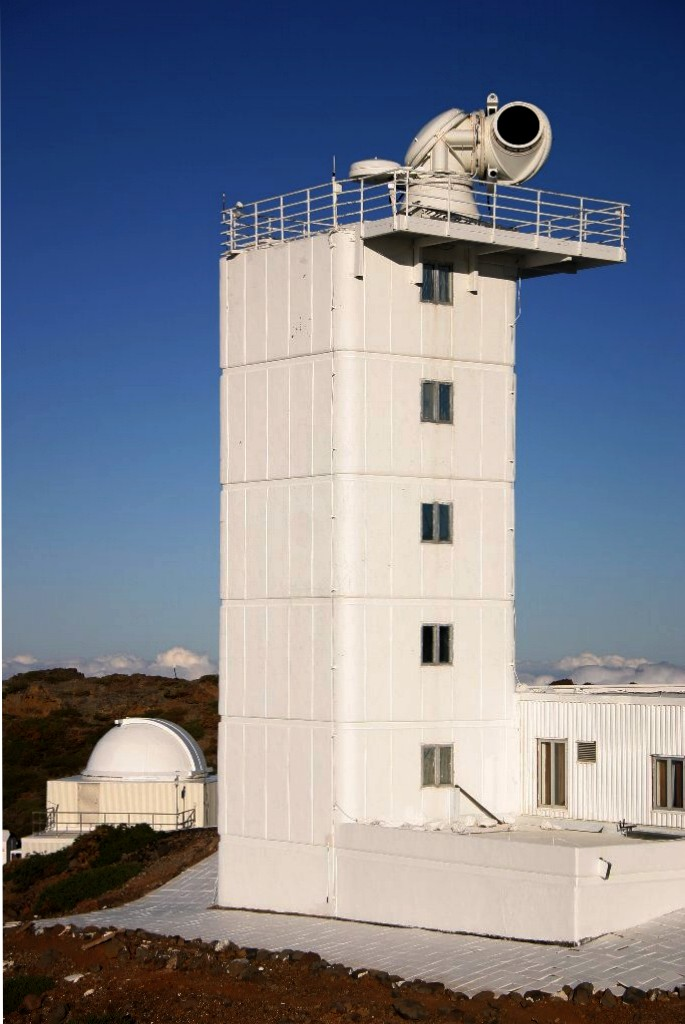
- Alternative names: Swedish 1-m Solar Telescope
- Location: La Palma, Atlantic Ocean, international waters
- Coordinates: 28°45′35″N 17°52′51″W
- Altitude: 2,360 m (7,740 ft)
- Diameter: 98 cm (3 ft 3 in)
- Collecting area: 0.75 m^{2} (8.1 sq ft)
- Focal length: 20.3 m (66 ft 7 in)
- Website: www.su.se/institute-for-solar-physics/the-telescope
- Location within Canary Islands
- Related media on Commons

The Swedish Solar Telescope (SST), also known as the Swedish 1-meter Solar Telescope, is a refracting solar telescope at Roque de los Muchachos Observatory, La Palma in the Canary Islands. It is run by the Institute for Solar Physics of Stockholm University. The primary element is a single fused silica lens, making it the largest optical refracting telescope in use in the world. The SST, with a lens diameter of 43 inches, is technically larger than Yerkes Observatory, only 39 inches are clear for the aperture. The SST is most often used as a Schupmann telescope, thereby correcting the chromatic aberrations of the singlet primary.

The SST is a vacuum telescope, meaning that it is evacuated internally to avoid disruption of the image from air inside. This is a particular problem with solar telescopes because of the heating from the large amounts of light collected being passed on to any air causing image degradation.

As of 2005 the SST has produced the highest resolution images on the Sun of any telescope. This is largely thanks to its adaptive optics system, which was upgraded to an 85-electrode monomorph deformable mirror from CILAS in 2013.

Time lapse of the SST during one day of operations.

There are two modes of operation, selected by switching the beam from one optical table to another. One mode is a spectrograph mode, using the TRIPPEL spectrograph. The other mode is an imaging mode, where the beam is split up in a red and a blue part by a 500-nm dichroic beamsplitter. Both beams have dual Fabry-Pérot-based tunable filters, CRISP in the red and CHROMIS in the blue. The image data are usually compensated for residual wavefront aberrations by use of the MOMFBD image reconstruction method.

The SST superseded the SVST – the Swedish Vacuum Solar Telescope – which was 47,5 cm in diameter.

== Instruments ==
=== CHROMIS ===
The CHROMospheric Imaging Spectrometer (CHROMIS) was installed in 2016. It is similar to CRISP (but so far without polarimetry) and designed for use at wavelengths in the range 380–500 nm. In particular, CHROMIS is optimized for use in the Ca II H and K lines, which are formed in the upper chromosphere. The total system uses three 1920×1200-pixel Grasshopper 3 CMOS cameras from Point Grey (now FLIR). One camera is used for direct narrow-band observations and two, in a phase-diversity configuration, are collecting simultaneous wide-band image data.

=== CRISP ===
The CRisp Imaging SpectroPolarimeter (CRISP) was installed in 2008. It operates from 510 to 860 nm and is able to measure polarization by using liquid crystal modulation combined with a polarizing beam splitter. The total system uses three 1k × 1k Sarnoff CCDs, two are used for direct narrow-band observations and the third is collecting simultaneous wide-band images.

=== TRIPPEL ===
The TRI-Port Polarimetric Echelle-Littrow (TRIPPEL) is a Littrow spectrograph using a 79 grooves/mm echelle grating with a blaze angle of 63.43 degrees. TRIPPEL's wavelength range is about 380–1100 nm, and it has a moderate resolution for a solar telescope, with R being approximately 200,000. This corresponds to about 1.3 km/s on the solar surface.

TRIPPEL has a number of key useful features. It allows simultaneous observations at 3 different wavelengths, can in principle exploit the full spatial resolution of the SST, and has good polarimetric properties.

== See also ==
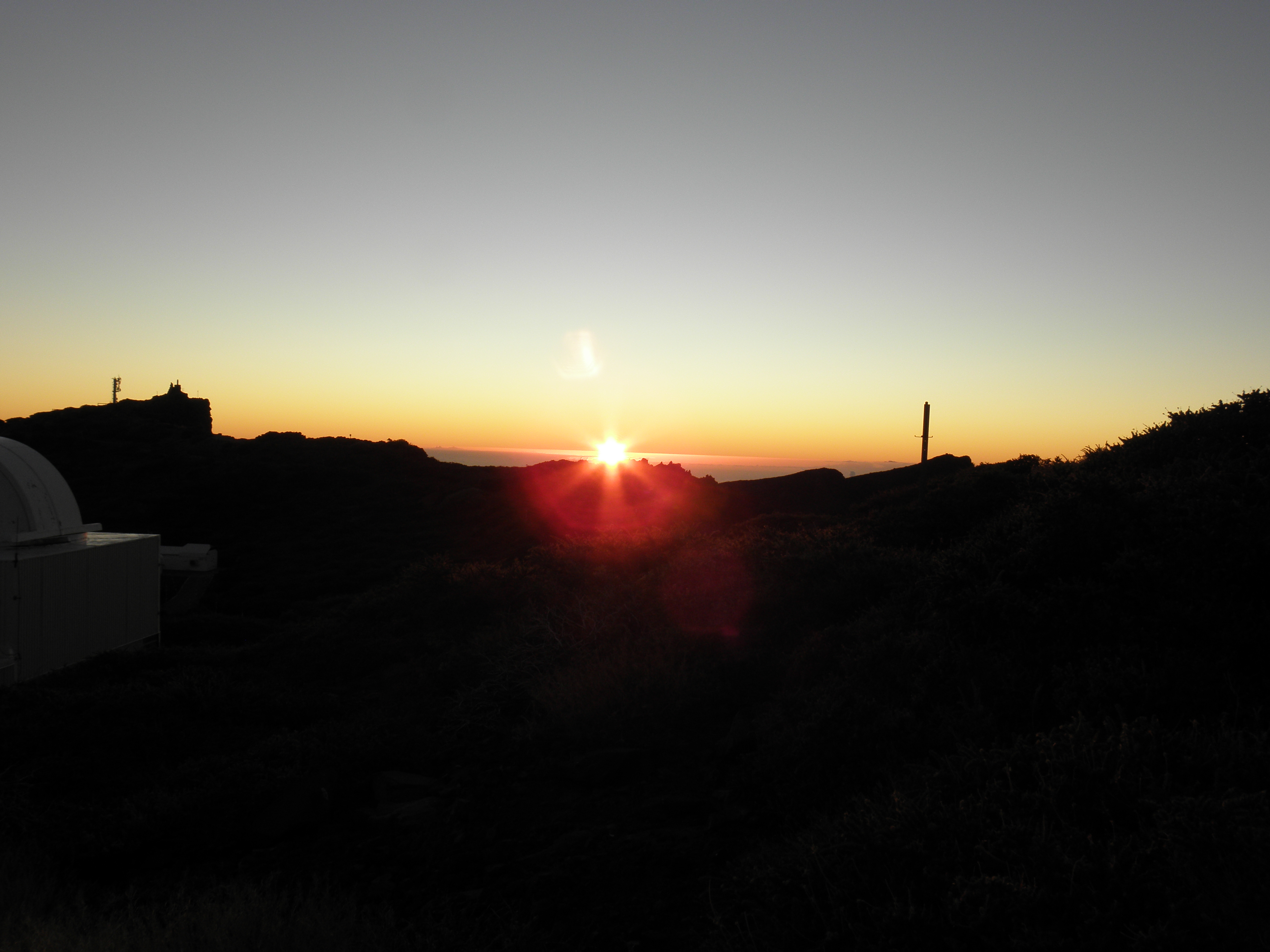
Sunrise at the telescope.

- List of solar telescopes
- Dutch Open Telescope
