= Eddington (spacecraft) =

Cancelled ESA mission to search for extrasolar planets

- Mission type: Space observatory
- Operator: European Space Agency
- Mission duration: –

Spacecraft properties
- Spacecraft type: Space telescope

Start of mission
- Launch date: Cancelled (originally planned for 2007)
- Contemporary ESA insignia (2000s)

The Eddington mission was a European Space Agency (ESA) project that planned to search for Earth-like planets, but was cancelled in 2003. It was named for the noted astronomer Arthur Eddington, who formulated much of the modern theory of stellar atmospheres and stellar structure, popularized Albert Einstein's work in the English language, carried out the first test (gravitational lensing) of the general theory of relativity, and made original contributions to the theory. It was originally planned for operation in 2008, but was delayed. The ESA website now records its status as cancelled.

== Overview ==
Using a single spacecraft in Earth orbit equipped with four telescopes, Eddington was to examine different regions of the sky for intervals of about two months each. The telescope would observe more than 500 000 stars for a possible transits and collect asteroseismic data for 50 000 stars in a high temporal resolution.

The mission was then planned to search for Earth-like planets orbiting other stars, pointing continuously at one region of the sky for three years. It would measure light from more than 100,000 stars and detect the tiny decrease in light as a planet passes in front of a star.

Eddington was advocated as the culmination of an international attempt to perform asteroseismology from space. Two small precursor space missions have taken place. The French COROT mission (2006-2014) searched for other planets. Microvariability and Oscillations of STars (MOST, 2003-2019) was a Canadian mission using a 15 cm telescope.

== Planned launch ==
The launch vehicle was to have been a Soyuz-Fregat rocket from the Baikonur Cosmodrome. It was to have travelled beyond the Moon to the L_{2} Lagrangian point. It would have stayed there for the planned 5-year mission length. The launch mass was planned at 1640 kg.

== Expected performance ==
Eddington was to be a European counterpart to Kepler, expecting to detect thousands of planets of any size and a few tens of terrestrial planets that are potentially habitable. Budget overruns with other ESA missions led to the cancellation of the mission in November 2003, despite strong protests from the scientific community.

== See also ==
- PLATO
- Kepler space telescope
