= Gran Telescopio Canarias =

Optical telescope on La Palma, Spain

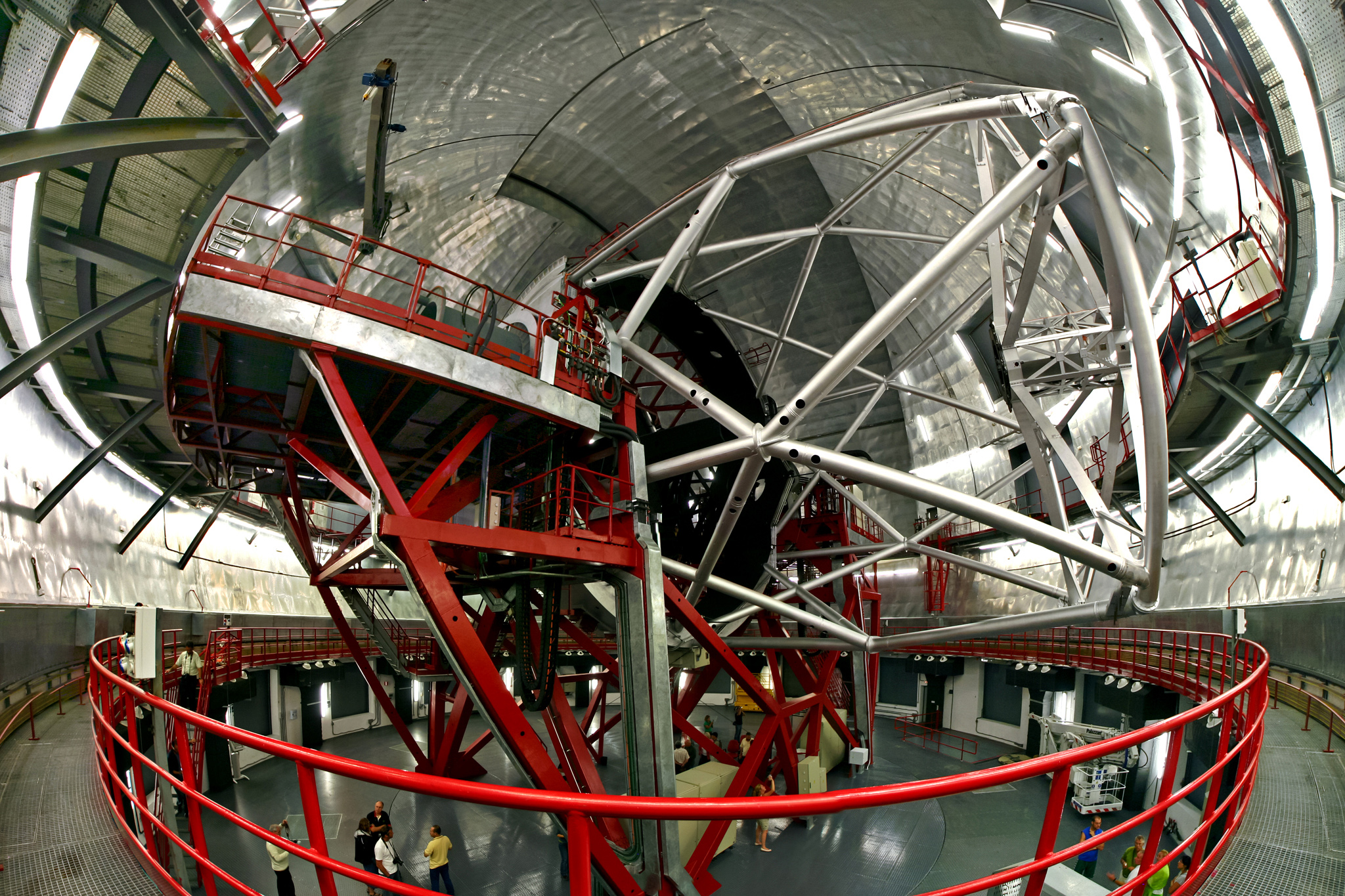
- Gran Telescopio Canarias, 2008
- Alternative names: GranTeCan
- Location: La Palma, Atlantic Ocean, international waters
- Coordinates: 28°45′24″N 17°53′31″W
- Altitude: 2,267 m (7,438 ft)
- Diameter: 10.4 m (34 ft 1 in)
- Collecting area: 78.54 m^{2} (845.4 sq ft)
- Focal length: 169.9 m (557 ft 5 in)
- Website: www.gtc.iac.es
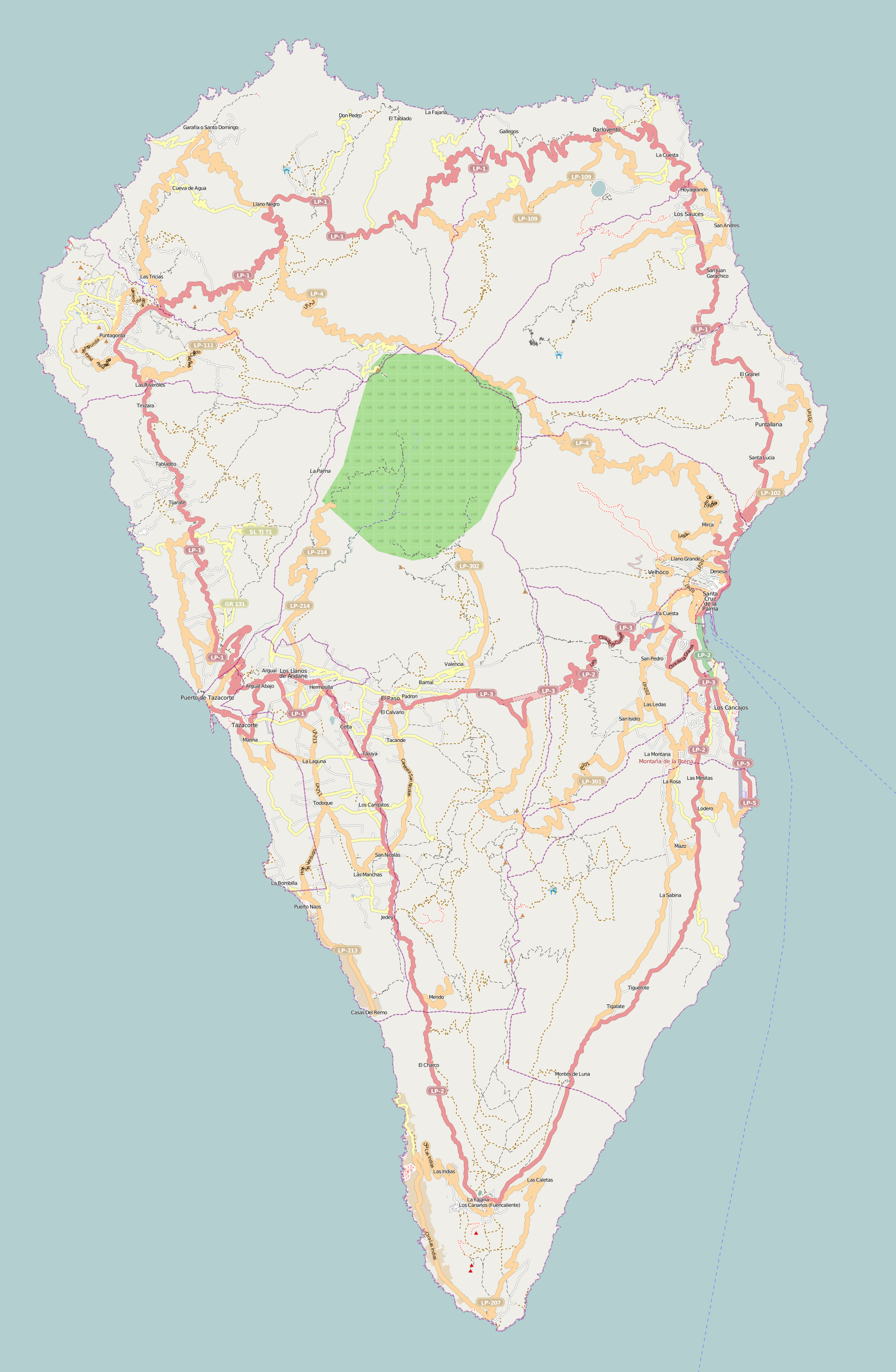
- Location within La Palma
- Related media on Commons

The Gran Telescopio Canarias (GranTeCan or GTC) is a 10.4 m (410 in) reflecting telescope located at the Roque de los Muchachos Observatory on the island of La Palma, in the Canary Islands, Spain. It is the world's largest single-aperture optical telescope.

Construction of the telescope took seven years and cost €130 million. Its installation was hampered by weather conditions and the logistical difficulties of transporting equipment to such a remote location. First light was achieved in 2007, and scientific observations began in 2009.

The GTC Project is a partnership formed by several institutions from Spain and Mexico, the University of Florida, the National Autonomous University of Mexico, and the Instituto de Astrofísica de Canarias (IAC). Planning for the construction of the telescope, which started in 1987, involved more than 1,000 people from 100 companies. The division of telescope time reflects the structure of its financing: 90% Spain, 5% Mexico and 5% the University of Florida.

== History ==
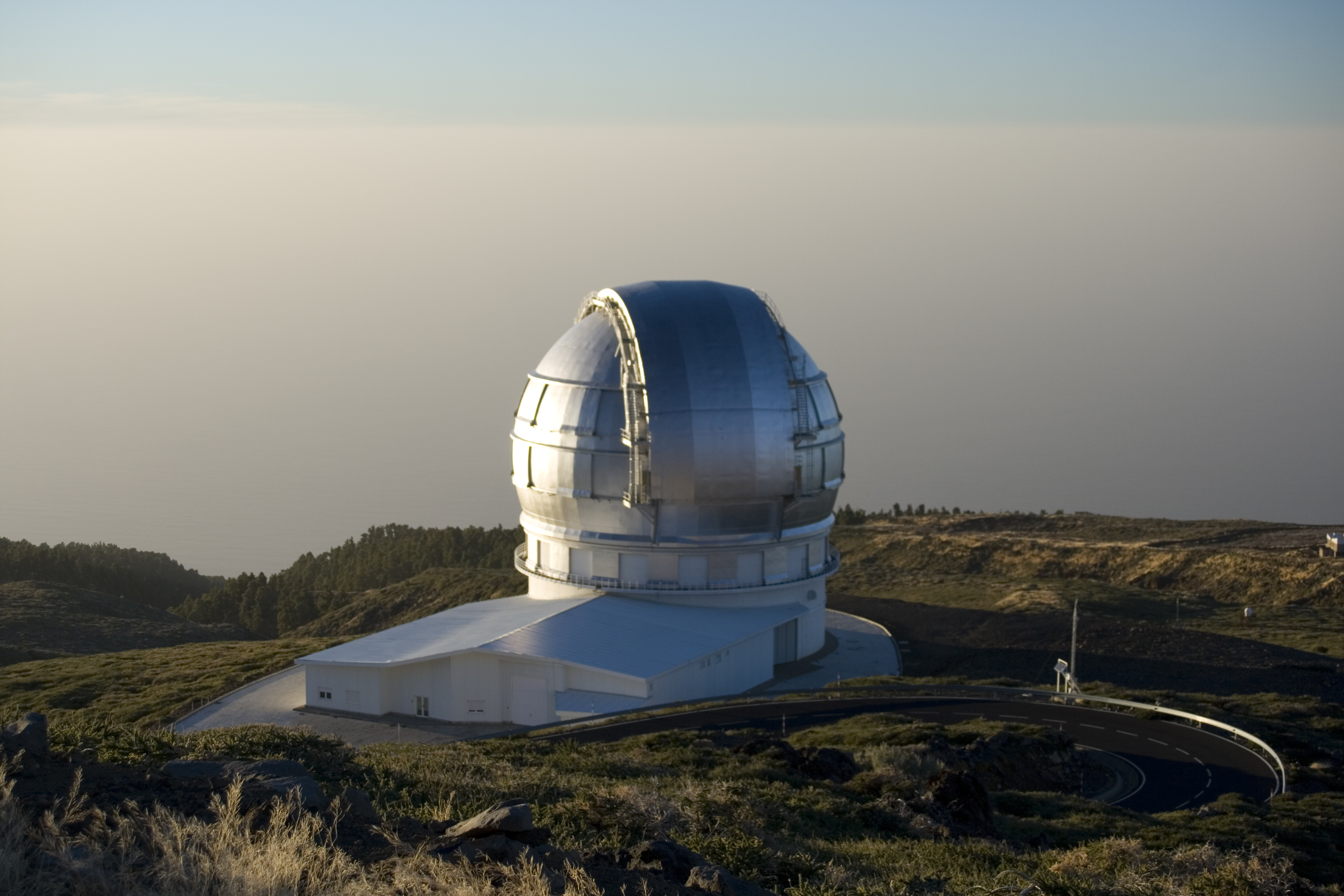
Dome of the GTC at sunset

=== First light ===
The GTC began its preliminary observations on 13 July 2007, using 12 segments of its primary mirror, made of Zerodur glass-ceramic by the German company Schott AG. Later, the number of segments was increased to a total of 36 hexagonal segments fully controlled by an active optics control system, working together as a reflective unit. Its first instrument was the Optical System for Imaging and low Resolution Integrated Spectroscopy (OSIRIS). Scientific observations began in May 2009.

=== Inauguration ceremony ===
The Gran Telescopio Canarias formally opened its shutters on July 24, 2009, inaugurated by King Juan Carlos I of Spain. More than 500 astronomers, government officials and journalists from Europe and the Americas attended the ceremony.

=== Instrumentation ===
GTC hosts a suite of advanced instruments, including:

Comparison of nominal sizes of apertures of the Gran Telescopio Canarias and some notable optical telescopes

- OSIRIS: Optical System for Imaging and low-Intermediate-Resolution Integrated Spectroscopy The IAC's OSIRIS (Optical System for Imaging and low Resolution Integrated Spectroscopy), is an imager and spectrograph covering wavelengths from 0.365 to 1.05 μm. It has a field of view (FOV) of 7 × 7 arcmin for direct imaging, and 8 arcmin × 5.2 arcmin for low resolution spectroscopy. For spectroscopy, it offers tunable filters.
- EMIR: Espectrógrafo Multiobjeto Infra-Rojo (near-infrared multi-object spectrograph)
- MEGARA: Multi-Espectrógrafo en GTC de Alta Resolución para Astronomía is an optical integral-field and multi-object spectrograph covering the visible light and near infrared wavelength range between 0.365 and 1 μm with a spectral resolution in the range R=6000–20000. The MEGARA IFU (also called the Large Compact Bundle, or LCB) offers a contiguous field of view of 12.5 arcsec x 11.3 arcsec, while the multi-object spectroscopy mode allows 92 objects to be observed simultaneously in a field of view of 3.5 arcmin x 3.5 arcmin by means of an equal number of robotic positioners. Both the LCB and MOS modes make use of 100 μm-core optical fibers (1267 in total) that are attached to a set of microlens arrays (with 623 spaxels in the case of the LCB and 92 x 7 in the case of the MOS) with each microlens covering an hexagonal region of 0.62 arcsec in diameter.
- HiPERCAM: High-speed optical camera
- CanariCam: is designed as a diffraction-limited imager. It is optimized as an imager, and although it offered a range of other observing modes, these did not compromise the imaging capability. CanariCam worked in the thermal infrared between approximately 7.5 and 25 μm. At the short-wavelength end, the cut-off was determined by the atmosphere—specifically atmospheric seeing. At the long wavelength end, the cut-off was determined by the detector; this loses sensitivity beyond around 24 μm, although the cut-off for individual detectors varied significantly. CanariCam was a very compact design. It was designed for a total weight of the cryostat and its on-telescope electronics to be under 400 kg. Most previous mid-infrared instruments have used liquid helium as a cryogen; one of the requirements of CanariCam was that it should require no expensive and difficult to handle cryogens.. CanariCam used a two-stage closed cycle cryocooler system to cool the cold optics and cryostat interior to approximately 28 K (−245 °C; −409 °F), and the detector itself to around 8 K (−265 °C; −445 °F), the temperature at which the detector worked most efficiently. CanariCam was decommissioned as of February 2021.

== See also ==
- Other observatory sites
  - La Silla Observatory
  - Mauna Kea Observatories
  - Paranal Observatory
- Lists and comparisons
  - Extremely large telescope
  - List of largest optical reflecting telescopes
  - List of largest optical telescopes historically
