= Roque de los Muchachos Observatory =

Astronomical observatory on La Palma, Canary Islands

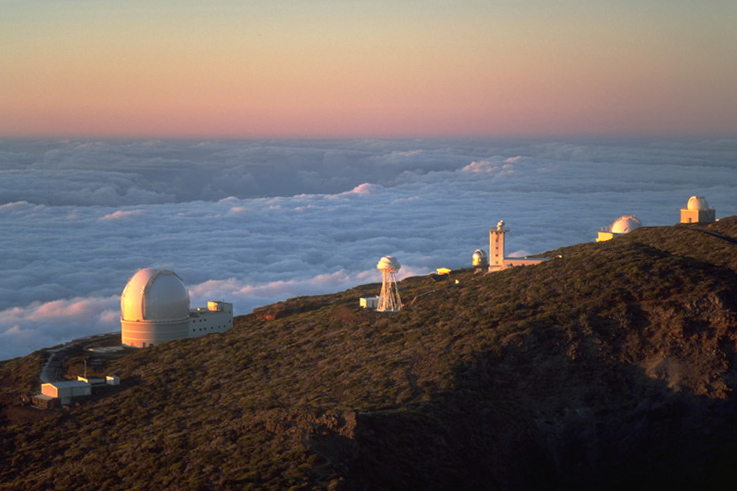
- Overview of some of the telescopes at the Roque de los Muchachos Observatory.
- Alternative names: ORM
- Organization: Instituto de Astrofísica de Canarias
- Observatory code: 950
- Location: Garafía, Province of Santa Cruz de Tenerife, Canary Islands, Spain
- Coordinates: 28°45′49″N 17°53′41″W
- Altitude: 2,396 m (7,861 ft)
- Established: 29 June 1985
- Website: www.iac.es/en/observatorios-de-canarias/roque-de-los-muchachos-observatory,%20https://www.iac.es/es/observatorios-de-canarias/observatorio-del-roque-de-los-muchachos
- Telescopes: DIMM-TNG; FACT; LST-1; Carlsberg Meridian Telescope; Dutch Open Telescope; European Solar Telescope; Galileo National Telescope; Gran Telescopio Canarias; HEGRA; Isaac Newton Group of Telescopes; Isaac Newton Telescope; Jacobus Kapteyn Telescope; Liverpool Telescope; MAGIC; MASCARA; Mercator Telescope; Nordic Optical Telescope; Swedish Solar Telescope; Wide Angle Search for Planets; William Herschel Telescope
- Location within Canary Islands
- Related media on Commons

Roque de los Muchachos Observatory (Spanish: Observatorio del Roque de los Muchachos, ORM) is an astronomical observatory located in the municipality of Garafía on the island of La Palma in the Canary Islands, Spain. The observatory site is operated by the Instituto de Astrofísica de Canarias, based on nearby Tenerife. ORM is part of the European Northern Observatory.

The seeing statistics at ORM make it the second-best location for optical and infrared astronomy in the Northern Hemisphere, after Mauna Kea Observatory, Hawaii. The site also has some of the most extensive astronomical facilities in the Northern Hemisphere; its fleet of telescopes includes the 10.4 m Gran Telescopio Canarias, the world's largest single-aperture optical telescope as of July 2009, the William Herschel Telescope (second largest in Europe), and the adaptive optics corrected Swedish 1-m Solar Telescope.

The observatory was established in 1985, after 15 years of international work and cooperation by several countries, with the Spanish island hosting many telescopes from Britain, The Netherlands, Spain, and other countries. The island provided better seeing conditions for the telescopes that had been moved to Herstmonceux Castle by the Royal Greenwich Observatory, including the 98 inch aperture Isaac Newton Telescope (the largest reflector in Europe at that time). When it was moved to the island it was upgraded to a 100-inch (2.54 meter), and many even larger telescopes from various nations would be hosted there.

== History ==
The building of the observatory goes back to 1969, with the start of the Northern Hemisphere Observatory project. After ten years of research on the site there was a big international agreement between several nations to establish an international Observatory at La Palma.

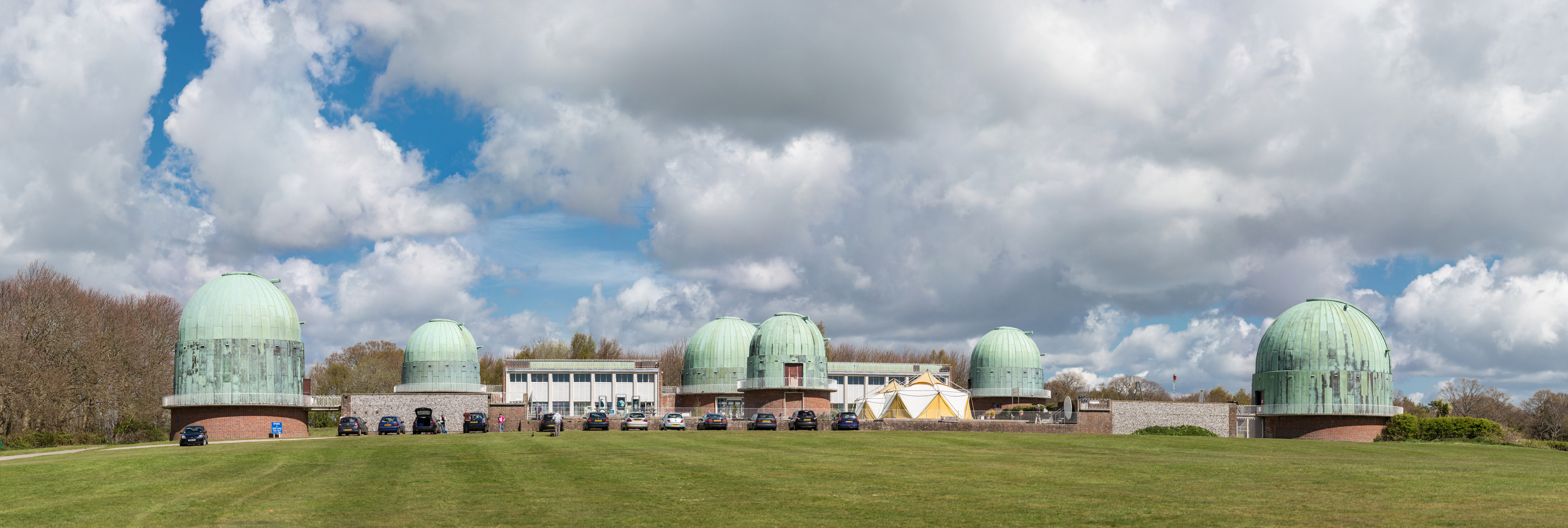
The former Royal Greenwich Observatory at Herstmonceux in East Sussex demonstrating its cloudy viewing conditions, which led to a search for a better location for the large telescopes

The observatory began operation around 1984 with the Isaac Newton Telescope, which was moved to La Palma from the Royal Greenwich Observatory site at Herstmonceux Castle in East Sussex, England. The move was troubled, and it is widely recognized that it would have been cheaper to build a new telescope on-site rather than to move an existing one.

The observatory was first staffed by representatives from Spain, Sweden, Denmark and the United Kingdom. Other countries which became involved later include Germany, Italy, Norway, the Netherlands, Finland, Iceland, and the United States.

The observatory was officially inaugurated on 29 June 1985 by the Spanish royal family and six European heads of state. Four helicopter pads were built at the observatory to allow the dignitaries to arrive in comfort. The observatory has expanded considerably over time, with the 4.2m William Herschel Telescope opened in 1987, the Nordic Optical Telescope in 1988 and several smaller solar or specialized telescopes; the Galileo National Telescope opened in 1998 and the Gran Telescopio Canarias opened in 2006, with its full aperture in 2009.

A fire on the mountainside in 1997 damaged one of the gamma-ray telescopes, but subsequent fires in September 2005 and August 2009 did no serious damage to either the buildings or the telescopes.

In 2016, the Instituto de Astrofísica de Canarias and Cherenkov Telescope Array Observatory signed an agreement to host CTA’s northern hemisphere array at the ORM.

In 2016, the observatory was announced as the second-choice location for the Thirty Meter Telescope, in the event that the Mauna Kea site is not feasible.

== Climate ==
The ORM has a warm-summer mediterranean climate (Köppen: Csb; Trewartha: Dobk), which is different from the dry climate of the coastal areas. Due to its location at an altitude of 2,223 metres (7,293 ft) and on the windward slope, the precipitation is much higher than that of the coastal areas. The climate is warm all year round, with no extreme heat in summer, but winters below freezing are more common, and frost is frequent from December to April of the following year.

Climate data for Roque de los Muchachos Observatory Climate ID: C101A; coordinates 28°45′21″N 17°53′43″W; elevation: 2,223 m (7,293 ft); 2019–2024 normals, extremes 2019–present
Month	Jan	Feb	Mar	Apr	May	Jun	Jul	Aug	Sep	Oct	Nov	Dec	Year
Record high °C (°F)	19.2 (66.6)	20.5 (68.9)	21.4 (70.5)	21.4 (70.5)	24.5 (76.1)	25.5 (77.9)	29.3 (84.7)	29.7 (85.5)	26.2 (79.2)	23.8 (74.8)	19.4 (66.9)	19.0 (66.2)	29.7 (85.5)
Mean daily maximum °C (°F)	9.4 (48.9)	9.2 (48.6)	12.1 (53.8)	13.3 (55.9)	16.3 (61.3)	18.5 (65.3)	24.3 (75.7)	23.7 (74.7)	18.7 (65.7)	16.8 (62.2)	13.5 (56.3)	11.0 (51.8)	15.6 (60.1)
Daily mean °C (°F)	6.2 (43.2)	6.0 (42.8)	8.3 (46.9)	9.2 (48.6)	12.1 (53.8)	14.4 (57.9)	20.3 (68.5)	19.8 (67.6)	15.1 (59.2)	13.9 (57.0)	10.3 (50.5)	8.0 (46.4)	11.9 (53.4)
Mean daily minimum °C (°F)	2.9 (37.2)	2.7 (36.9)	4.6 (40.3)	5.1 (41.2)	7.9 (46.2)	10.4 (50.7)	16.2 (61.2)	15.9 (60.6)	11.3 (52.3)	10.3 (50.5)	7.0 (44.6)	4.8 (40.6)	8.2 (46.8)
Record low °C (°F)	−4.1 (24.6)	−3.7 (25.3)	−3.1 (26.4)	−3.4 (25.9)	−1.3 (29.7)	3.7 (38.7)	9.4 (48.9)	8.1 (46.6)	4.6 (40.3)	0.9 (33.6)	−1.3 (29.7)	−0.9 (30.4)	−4.1 (24.6)
Average precipitation mm (inches)	111.0 (4.37)	78.6 (3.09)	69.4 (2.73)	39.2 (1.54)	5.9 (0.23)	43.5 (1.71)	0.0 (0.0)	4.5 (0.18)	19.0 (0.75)	19.1 (0.75)	74.1 (2.92)	74.6 (2.94)	538.5 (21.20)
Average precipitation days (≥ 0.1 mm)	6.67	7.67	6.25	4.75	2.75	3.25	0.00	1.25	4.50	3.75	6.00	8.60	55.43
Average relative humidity (%)	54	58	37	45	32	33	21	26	45	39	46	52	40
Percentage possible sunshine	73	75	81	85	86	86	88	87	80	82	76	69	81
Source: State Meteorological Agency/AEMET OpenData

== Telescopes/observatories ==
The Spanish island is host to the premiere collection of telescopes and observatories from around the World, for the northern hemisphere excluding the Hawaiian islands which has a different mix of telescopes. The 10.4 meter Grand Telescope Canarias is the largest single aperture for an astronomical observatory in the world.

- Carlsberg Meridian Telescope (1984–2013)
- Dutch Open Telescope
- First G-APD Cherenkov Telescope (FACT) (2011– )
- Galileo National Telescope
- Gran Telescopio Canarias (2007– )
- Gravitational-wave Optical Transient Observer (GOTO-N)
- HEGRA
- Isaac Newton Telescope
- Jacobus Kapteyn Telescope
- Liverpool Telescope (2003– )
- MAGIC
- MASCARA
- Mercator Telescope
- Nordic Optical Telescope
- Swedish Solar Telescope
- Wide Angle Search for Planets (WASP)
- William Herschel Telescope
- European Solar Telescope (In project)

== Gallery ==
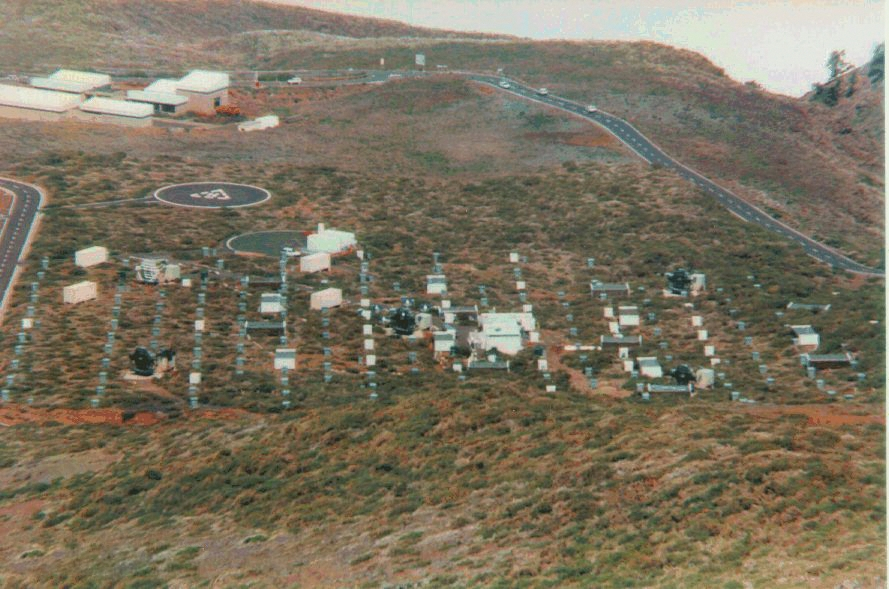
Several of the helicopter pads built for the inauguration ceremony can be seen under the now dismantled HEGRA array

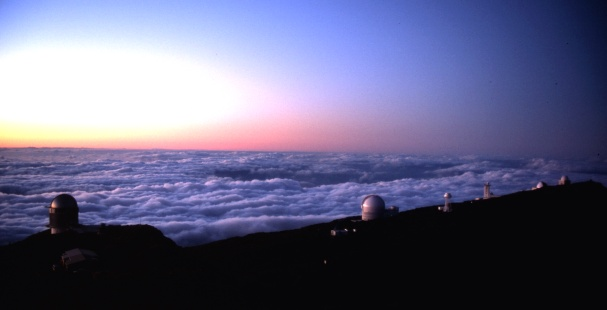
Telescopes at the observatory at sunset, from left to right: the NOT, the WHT, the DOT, the SST, the Mercator Telescope and the ING

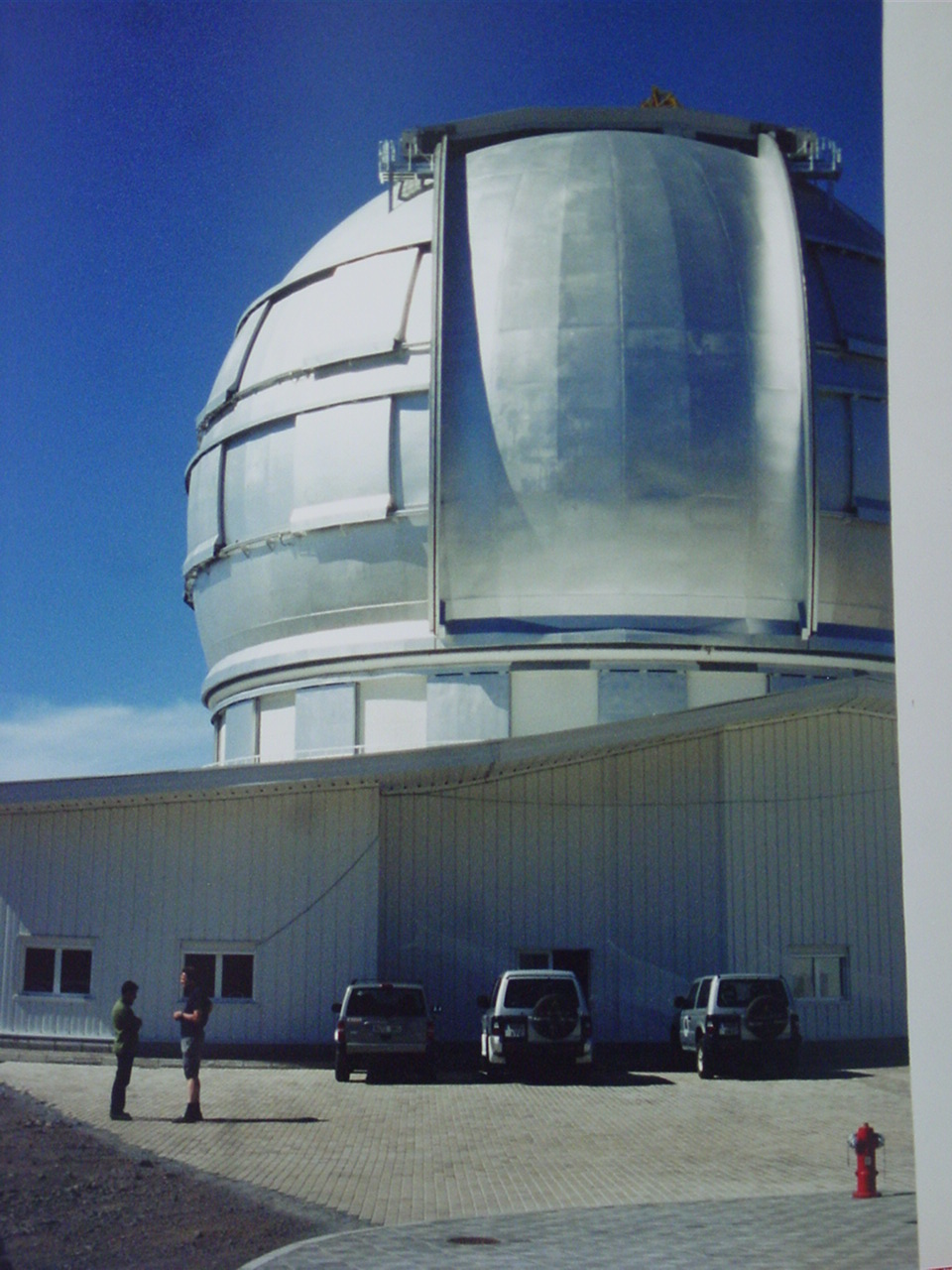
Picture of the 10m Gran Telescopio Canarias building under construction in March 2003

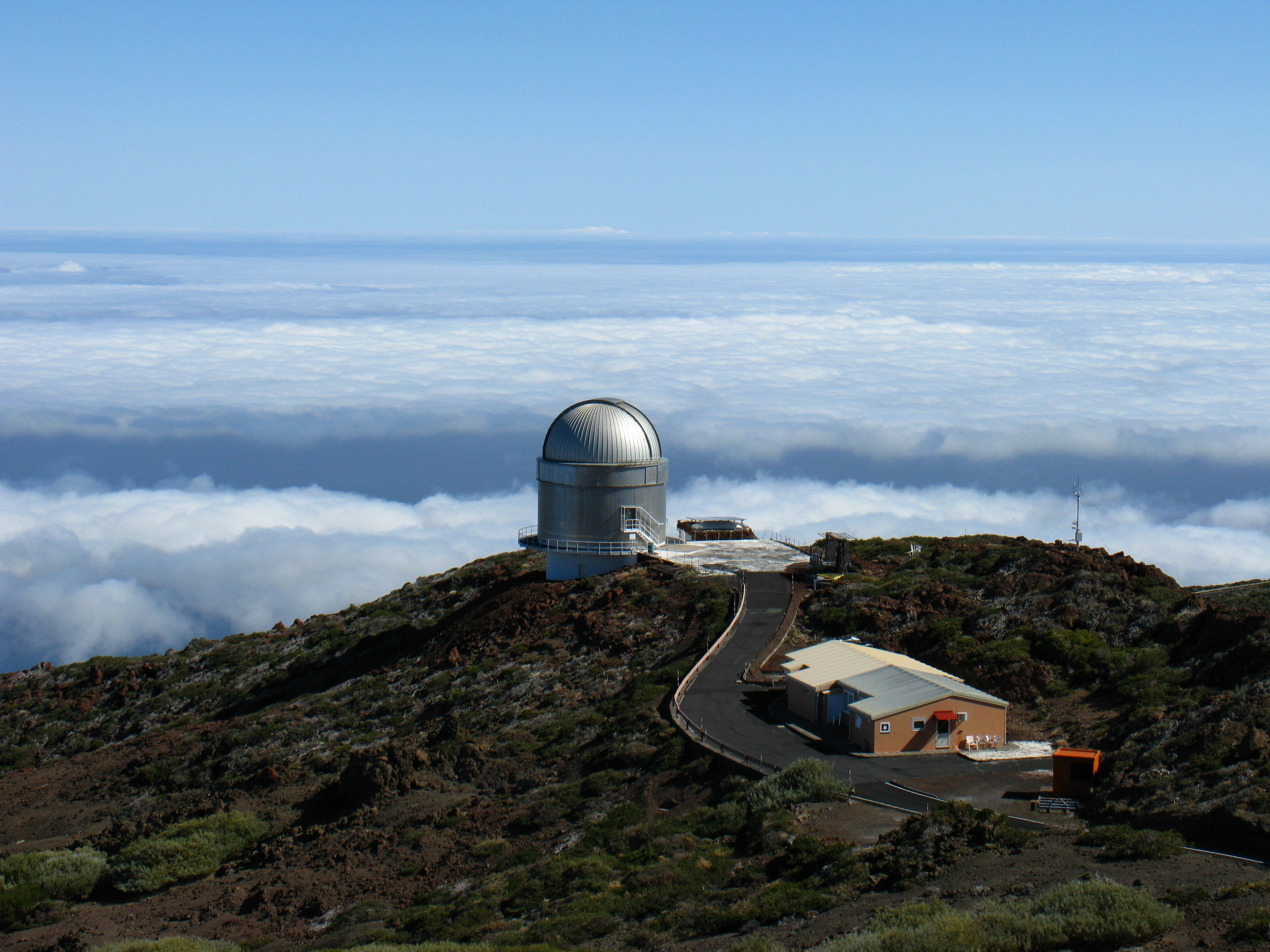
Picture of the Nordic Optical Telescope (NOT)

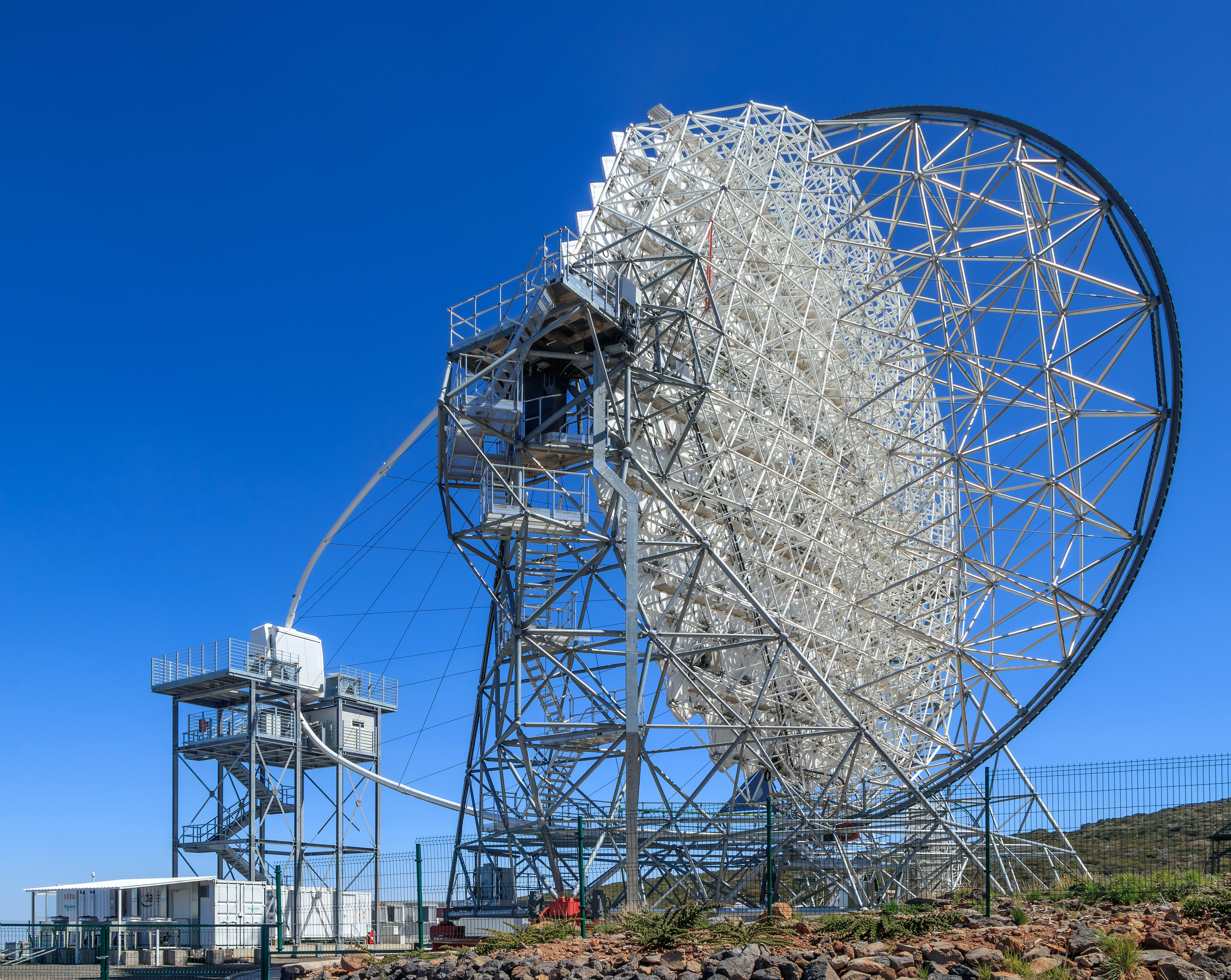
Large-Sized Telescope of the Cherenkov Telescope Array Observatory (CTAO)

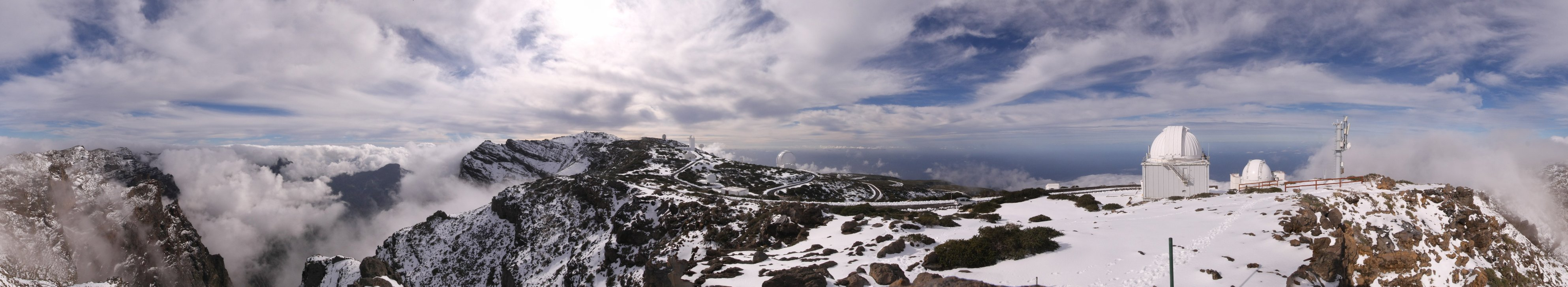
360 degrees panorama as taken on 2011 January 28

== See also ==
- Astronomical seeing
- Cherenkov Telescope Array
- Gran Telescopio Canarias
- IACT
- Instituto de Astrofísica de Canarias
- Isaac Newton Group
- La Palma
- List of space telescopes (Another important source of astronomical observations in this period)
- Roque de los Muchachos
- Teide Observatory
