= Space Radiation Laboratory (Caltech) =

Research group

- Established: 1960s
- Founding Directors: Edward C. Stone, Rochus Eugen Vogt
- Location: Pasadena, California, United States
- Affiliations: California Institute of Technology (Caltech)
- Website: srl.caltech.edu

The Space Radiation Laboratory (SRL) is a research group within the California Institute of Technology (Caltech) that develops space instruments and conducts research in cosmic rays, solar energetic particles (SEPs), and heliophysics. SRL has played leading roles in numerous NASA and international missions, often in collaboration with the Jet Propulsion Laboratory (JPL). SRL-originated instruments and analysis span from early balloon-borne experiments to flagship spacecraft such as IMP-8, the Voyager probes, Galileo, SAMPEX, the ACE observatory, STEREO, and the Parker Solar Probe, providing multi-decade measurements that shaped modern energetic-particle space physics.

== Research areas ==
SRL research focuses on:

- Galactic cosmic rays (GCRs): composition, isotopes, origins, and propagation through the interstellar medium.
- Solar energetic particles (SEPs): acceleration mechanisms at flares and coronal mass ejection (CME) shocks, including ^{3}He-rich events.
- Radiation belts: heavy-ion populations in planetary magnetospheres (e.g., Jupiter).
- Space weather: near-Earth particle fluxes and their implications for astronauts and spacecraft electronics.
- X-ray astronomy and high-energy astrophysics: instrumentation and observations with missions such as NuSTAR, including imaging of supermassive black holes, mapping of radioactive elements in supernova remnants, and studies of magnetars and active galactic nuclei.

== History ==
The groundwork for Caltech's Space Radiation Laboratory (SRL) began in the late 1950s and 1960s with balloon-borne studies of cosmic rays, using technology adapted from nuclear physics and launched from NASA's Columbia Scientific Balloon Facility in Palestine, Texas. During this era, Ed Stone and Robbie Vogt joined Caltech and helped establish a community centered on particle astrophysics, laying the foundation for SRL. Researchers in Caltech's physics department began adapting detector technology from nuclear physics, particularly solid-state and scintillation counters, for astrophysical use. These efforts established the measurement techniques that would later be applied to numerous spacecraft instrumentation.

In the 1970s, SRL transitioned from balloon experiments to space missions. With the Electron/Isotope Spectrometer on IMP-8 (1973), SRL began a legacy of precise spacecraft particle measurements. Just a few years later, SRL played a central role in the Voyager Cosmic Ray Subsystem, enabling decades-long measurements of galactic cosmic rays and solar particles throughout the heliosphere and beyond.

During the 1980s and 1990s, SRL broadened into planetary and heliospheric missions. The Galileo Heavy Ion Counter (1989) measured Jupiter's intense radiation environment. SRL also contributed to SAMPEX, NASA's first Small Explorer (1992), and later led key instruments on the ACE (1997), significantly advancing the study of elemental and isotopic composition of cosmic and solar particles.

In the 2000s, SRL was pivotal to solar particle missions. The laboratory led the Low Energy Telescope on STEREO (2006), enabling multi-spacecraft investigations of SEPs across the inner heliosphere and training new researchers in heliophysics instrumentation.

In the 2010s, SRL's expertise also contributed to high-energy astrophysics instrumentation through Caltech's leadership of the NuSTAR mission, launched in 2012 under Fiona Harrison. NuSTAR made the first focused hard X-ray images of supermassive black holes, mapped radioactive titanium-44 in the Cassiopeia A supernova remnant, discovered unusual emission from magnetars, and revealed hidden populations of black holes and active galactic nuclei. SRL has co-led the IS⊙IS particle suite on the Parker Solar Probe, contributing to the EPI-Hi instrument. The mission has made the first in-situ energetic-particle observations deep inside the corona, revealing new details about SEP acceleration and propagation, including rare ^{3}He-rich events and intense episodes such as the September 5, 2022 event at about 15 solar radii.

Throughout the 2020s, the Voyager CRS continues to monitor galactic cosmic rays beyond the heliosphere, while ACE/CRIS provides ongoing compositional data across solar cycles, ensuring SRL's measurements remain central to heliophysics today.

From balloon payloads in the 1960s to near-Sun probes and interstellar spacecraft in the 2020s, SRL, combining Caltech’s academic culture with JPL’s engineering excellence, has shaped the field of energetic-particle heliophysics for over six decades.

== Collaboration with JPL ==
Caltech SRL and the Jet Propulsion Laboratory (JPL) have a long-standing partnership in heliophysics. Many JPL scientists hold joint appointments with Caltech, and SRL graduate students often conduct research alongside JPL staff. The JPL engineering team contributed to instrument integration, thermal design, and testing for Advanced Composition Explorer, Voyager CRS, and Parker Solar Probe EPI-Hi.

This collaboration has allowed SRL to combine academic training and fundamental physics research with JPL’s applied expertise in spacecraft systems, environmental qualification, and mission operations. Together, SRL and JPL have co-led NASA instruments for over five decades.

== Missions and instruments ==
Over five decades, SRL has provided instruments for many heliophysics missions:

Launch year	Spacecraft	Instrument(s) (SRL/JPL involvement)	Key results
1973	IMP-8	Electron/Isotope Spectrometer (E/IS)	Measured low-energy electrons and H/He isotopes; established long-term baseline of cosmic-ray composition.
1977	Voyager 1/2	Cosmic Ray Subsystem (CRS)	First detection of GCRs beyond the heliopause; multi-decade SEP and GCR monitoring.
1989	Galileo	Heavy Ion Counter (HIC)	Characterized Jovian magnetosphere heavy-ion radiation, crucial for spacecraft design at Jupiter.
1992	SAMPEX	MAST, PET (contributed)	Measured anomalous cosmic rays, trapped particles; first NASA Small Explorer (SMEX) mission.
1997	ACE	CRIS, SIS, ULEIS	High-precision isotopes from He–Zn; landmark data on cosmic-ray origins, propagation, and SEP composition.
2006	STEREO	Low Energy Telescope (LET)	Ion composition (3–30 MeV/n), ^{3}He-rich SEPs, and trans-iron nuclei; enabled multipoint SEP studies.
2018	Parker Solar Probe	IS⊙IS / EPI-Hi	First in situ SEP/GCR observations inside 0.25 AU; revealed near-Sun acceleration and transport of particles.

== Facilities ==
SRL maintains cleanroom facilities, electronics development labs, and test areas for spaceflight hardware at Caltech. Instrument development includes detector design (solid-state, scintillator, Cherenkov), low-noise electronics, calibration systems, and ground support software. Close collaboration with JPL provides access to environmental test facilities, vibration and thermal-vacuum chambers, and mission integration support.
