= Edward C. Stone =

American scientist (1936–2024)

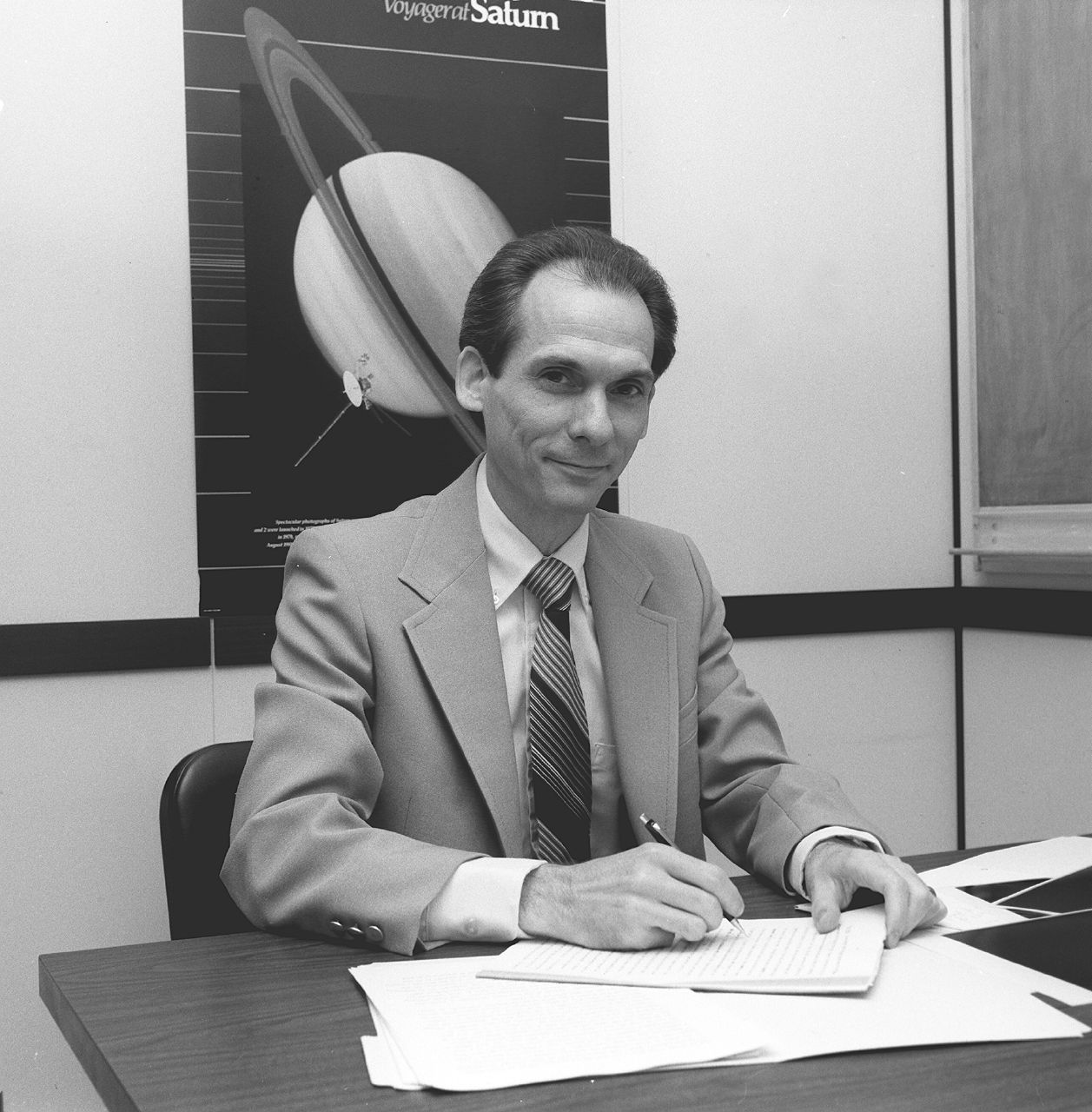
- Stone in 1981

7th Director of the Jet Propulsion Laboratory
- In office January 1, 1991 – April 30, 2001
- Preceded by: Lew Allen
- Succeeded by: Charles Elachi

Personal details
- Born: Edward Carroll Stone Jr. January 23, 1936 Knoxville, Iowa, U.S.
- Died: June 9, 2024 (aged 88) Pasadena, California, U.S.
- Known for: JPL director and Voyager scientist
- Scientific career
- Education: University of Chicago (MS, PhD)
- Fields: Space physics
- Thesis: Low Energy Cosmic-Ray Protons (1964)
- Doctoral advisor: John A. Simpson
- Doctoral students: Neil Gehrels; Jamie Sue Rankin

Edward Carroll Stone Jr. (January 23, 1936 – June 9, 2024) was an American space physicist, professor of physics at the California Institute of Technology, and director of the NASA Jet Propulsion Laboratory (JPL) from 1991 to 2001. He was the project scientist of the Voyager program, which sent two spacecraft to the outer Solar System's giant planets and became the first spacecraft to enter interstellar space.

Stone led the Voyager mission for 50 years, from 1972 until his retirement in 2022, overseeing the spacecraft's encounters with Jupiter (1979), Saturn (1980–1981), Uranus (1986) and Neptune (1989). Under his leadership, the mission discovered active volcanism on Jupiter's moon Io, new moons and ring systems. The Voyagers continued beyond the planets to cross the heliopause and enter the interstellar medium, with Voyager 1 becoming the first spacecraft to leave the Solar System in 2012, followed by Voyager 2 in 2018. The Voyager mission became the longest-running NASA mission, with Stone being its face and advocate.

As JPL director, Stone oversaw the successful launches of Mars Pathfinder with the first Mars rover Sojourner, Mars Global Surveyor, Cassini–Huygens and other missions during NASA's "faster, better, cheaper" era. Throughout his career, he served as principal investigator on nine NASA spacecraft missions, including SAMPEX, the Advanced Composition Explorer and scientific instruments on the Galileo and STEREO missions.

Stone's contributions to space science earned him the National Medal of Science (1991), the NASA Distinguished Public Service Medal (2013), and the Shaw Prize in Astronomy (2019). He was elected to the National Academy of Sciences in 1984 and played key roles in establishing major astronomical facilities, including overseeing the creation of the Laser Interferometer Gravitational-Wave Observatory (LIGO) during his tenure as chair of Caltech's Division of Physics, Mathematics and Astronomy, and supervising the construction of the W. M. Keck Observatory.

== Early life and education ==
Edward Carroll Stone Jr. was born in Knoxville, Iowa, on January 23, 1936, to Edward Carroll Stone Sr., a construction superintendent, and later a garage-door-installation company owner, and Ferne Elizabeth Stone (née Baber), a bookkeeper. He was the elder of two sons. Stone grew up in Burlington. While at school he worked at a J.C. Penney department store and was a member of the Burlington Municipal Band playing French horn.

Stone studied at Burlington Junior College in Iowa, and continued his education at the University of Chicago, where he earned his M.S. (1959) and Ph.D. (1964) degrees in physics. Initially, he planned to study nuclear physics, but became interested in space physics after the launch of the Soviet Sputnik in 1957. Stone began astrophysics research in 1961, working on a cosmic-ray telescope carried by the Discoverer 36 spy satellite. He worked on it under the cosmic-ray researcher John A. Simpson's supervision. The experiment became his PhD thesis, titled Low energy cosmic-ray protons. While in Chicago, Stone also worked with Eugene Parker; he said later that "Parker taught me how to reduce a problem to its nuts and bolts, to a picture."

== Caltech ==
Stone moved to Caltech to work on space physics with Rochus Eugen Vogt in 1964, and helped him establish the Space Radiation Laboratory. He became a full faculty member in 1967. In 1976, Stone was named professor of physics, later the David Morrisroe Professor of Physics, and was chair of the Division of Physics, Mathematics, and Astronomy from 1983 to 1988; during his tenure he oversaw the establishment of the Laser Interferometer Gravitational-Wave Observatory (LIGO). He also served as director of the Caltech Space Radiation Laboratory, and as vice president for Astronomical Facilities. He was the vice-chair of the Thirty Meter Telescope Board of Directors. He also served on the board of the California Association for Research in Astronomy (CARA) for nearly 25 years, and oversaw the construction of the W. M. Keck Observatory. He was also a W. M. Keck Foundation director, and chaired the Keck Foundation's Science and Engineering Committee for 24 years.

== Voyager program ==
In 1964, Gary Flandro, a summer student at JPL, found out that a rare planetary alignment of the giant planets would allow a mission he called "the Grand Tour". Such an alignment occurs every 175 years; Flandro calculated that the best option was to launch spacecraft in 1977. Gravity assist maneuvers were already known, but according to Flandro he was the first to notice the opportunity to visit the giant planets. (Note: According to Flandro, many experts were sceptical and didn't believe that such mission was possible: "After we had discovered this mission design, I consulted experts at JPL to find out whether they thought we had a workable notion. They showed no interest in the outer planets and proceeded to explain the many impossibilities confronting such missions. The guidance guys said, "No, you can't guide accurately enough." The spacecraft design people said, "No, you can't build a spacecraft that would survive long enough to do this." The data people proclaimed that "You can't transmit any useful data over interplanetary distances (and think of the time delay between transmission and receipt of the signal)." Every expert I consulted had a negative response. You know, they said, "You can't get through the asteroid belt. A spacecraft cannot survive passing through the asteroid belt between Mars and Jupiter without colliding with something." Another problem voiced was that "spacecraft electronics cannot survive passage through Jupiter's magnetic field," On-and-on the negative responses built up. They declared, "You just cannot do that. Come on, kid don't bother us anymore." That inspired me to work a little bit harder on selling this whole thing.") NASA was reluctant to finance the proposed mission of four spacecraft, but the proposal eventually transformed into the Voyager program.

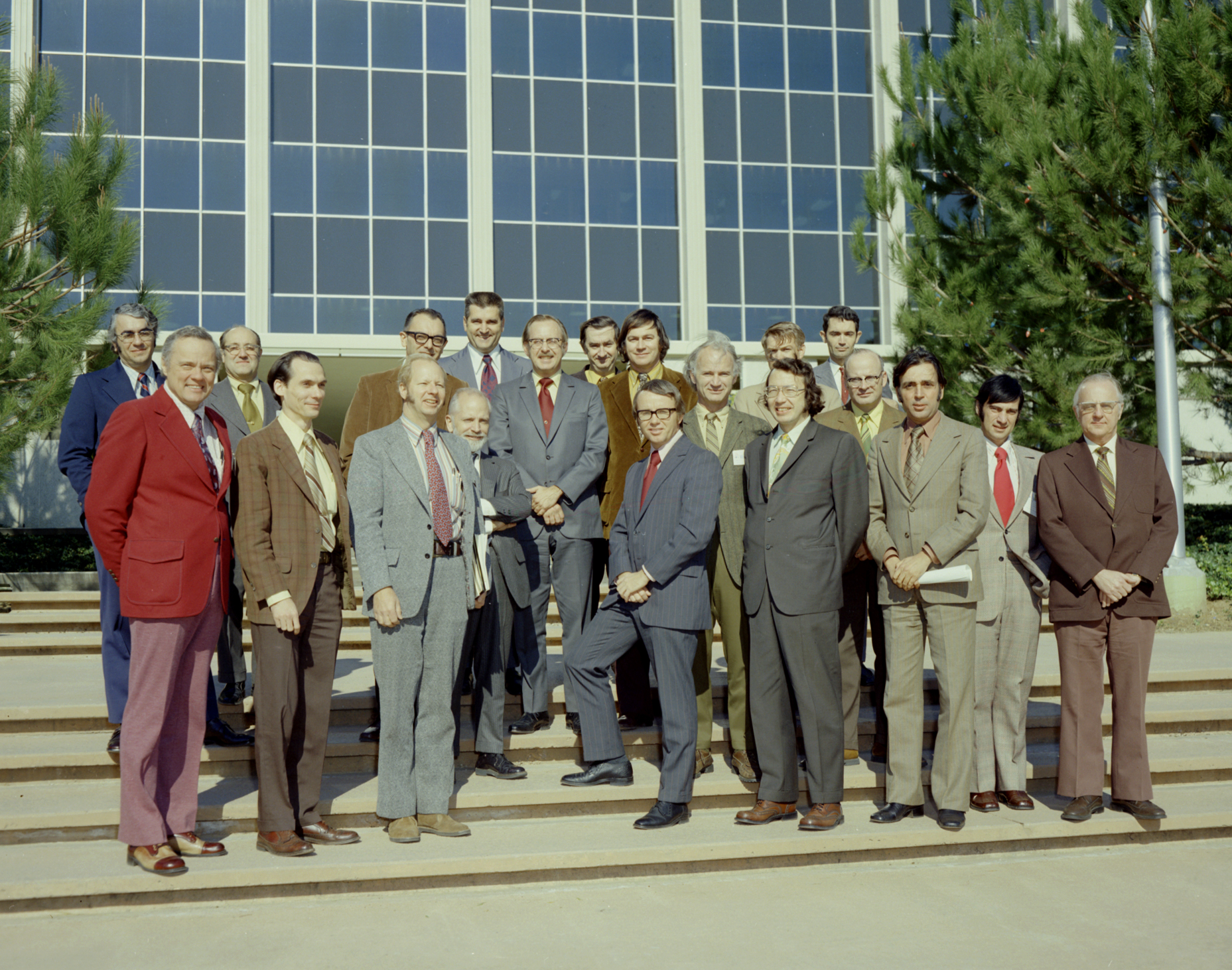
Stone (front row, second from left) at the Voyager first science meeting, 1972

In 1972, Stone became the project scientist for the Voyager program that sent two space probes to the giant planets in the outer Solar System. He was invited for the position by Harris "Bud" Schurmeier, the mission's first project manager; according to Schurmeier, Stone was proposed as the project scientist by Rochus Vogt, who was involved in the Grand Tour mission planning from the start. Stone himself was reluctant at first: as a scientist, he didn't want to sacrifice a lot of time for administrative work. (Note: According to Louis Friedman, a friend of both Stone and Schurmeier, who was involved in the Grand Tour program planning before it was transformed into Voyager: "Bud Schurmeier was a phenomenal person. He is the one who made the mission happen – he and his teams: spacecraft and mission. Ed without Bud wouldn't have done anything, and Bud without Ed wouldn't have [laugh] achieved the great results. But either of them without the support of the rest of the teams would also have not been able to do it alone. Voyager has many heroes. None, more than Bud Schurmeier.") Stone was also the principal investigator for the Cosmic Ray Subsystem experiment on both Voyager spacecraft.

Stone supervised the work of 11 teams of about 200 scientists; he organized "the clique-like teams" and work groups for key points of interest, "moons, rings, atmosphere and magnetosphere". Stone had the final word on observation target selection, instrument usage, and the spacecraft trajectories. A NASA official who was present at the first Voyager meeting, observed that "Stone knew more about every one of their instruments than the P.I.s themselves knew."

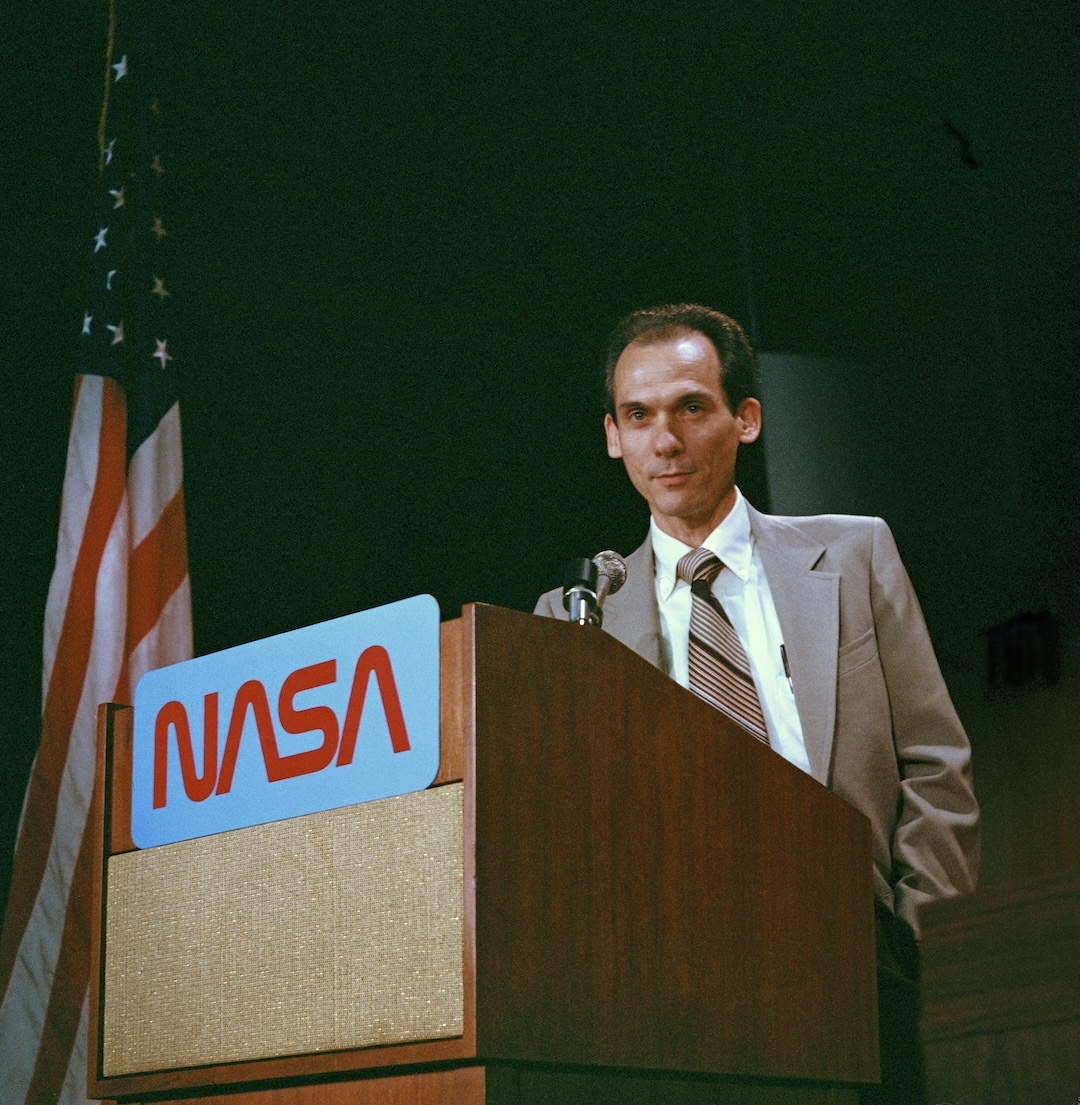
Stone during a press conference in the 1980s

Stone also became a spokesman for Voyager, and became well known to the public in the 1980s, after he held dozens of press conferences announcing Voyagers' discoveries. (Note: See more on press conferences in Butrica 2001, search for "The press conference was a keystone activity of the Project Scientist...") According to the Voyager project manager Norman Haynes, Stone "revolutionized the world of project science".

Stone said that planetary encounters and the discovery of volcanism on Io were the most memorable events of the Voyager mission for him. He recounted the team's regular work process:

There was a regular routine: In the afternoon we had a science meeting where individuals would say, "This is what we've seen" or "This is what we think" or "This is what we don't understand." Members from all 11 science teams participated, packing the conference room. These daily science meetings were a form of real time peer review that was also a way to choose which observations to report at the press conference the following morning. After the meeting, I would work with the investigators in outlining graphical illustrations that could be prepared overnight for use at the press conference at 10 a.m. In parallel, the imaging team would choose the images and prepare the captions for those that would be printed overnight for distribution to the reporters gathered at JPL. That afternoon, we would do it all over again with another day of observations and analyses.

Stephen P. Synnott recounted how Stone let him name a moon of Jupiter that he discovered on Voyager photos in 1980, saying "it looks like you've found yourself a moon" after checking the calculations. Synnott chose Thebe from a list of names suggested by the IAU.

Becoming Voyager project scientist was the best decision I made in my life.

[the Project Scientist served] an impedance matching function between the engineering requirements and constraints and the science requirements and constraints to try to find a way to achieve the optimum match between these two different sets of requirements and desirements.

Stone was the main advocate and salesman of the Voyagers. After the last planetary encounter he was able to receive funding for an extended mission, the Voyager Interstellar Mission. The Voyagers became the only spacecraft that left Solar System into interstellar space.

Jamie Sue Rankin became Stone's last PhD student. Her thesis was on the Voyagers' interstellar space data; she graduated in 2018 and became the Voyagers' deputy project scientist in 2022. Before Rankin, Stone refused to advise graduate students for about 25 years. Later, Rankin became the Voyager's deputy project scientist.

The Voyager mission visited all four giant planets and is the only spacecraft that visited Uranus and Neptune. It is NASA's longest-running spacecraft mission. In 2022, Stone retired after holding the role of the Voyager project scientist for 50 years.

Simultaneously with being the Voyager's project scientist, Stone taught first-year physics at Caltech, using examples from it: "The wonderful thing about planetary fly-bys is there’s a lot of freshman physics that you can talk about: the encounters, the trajectories."

== JPL ==
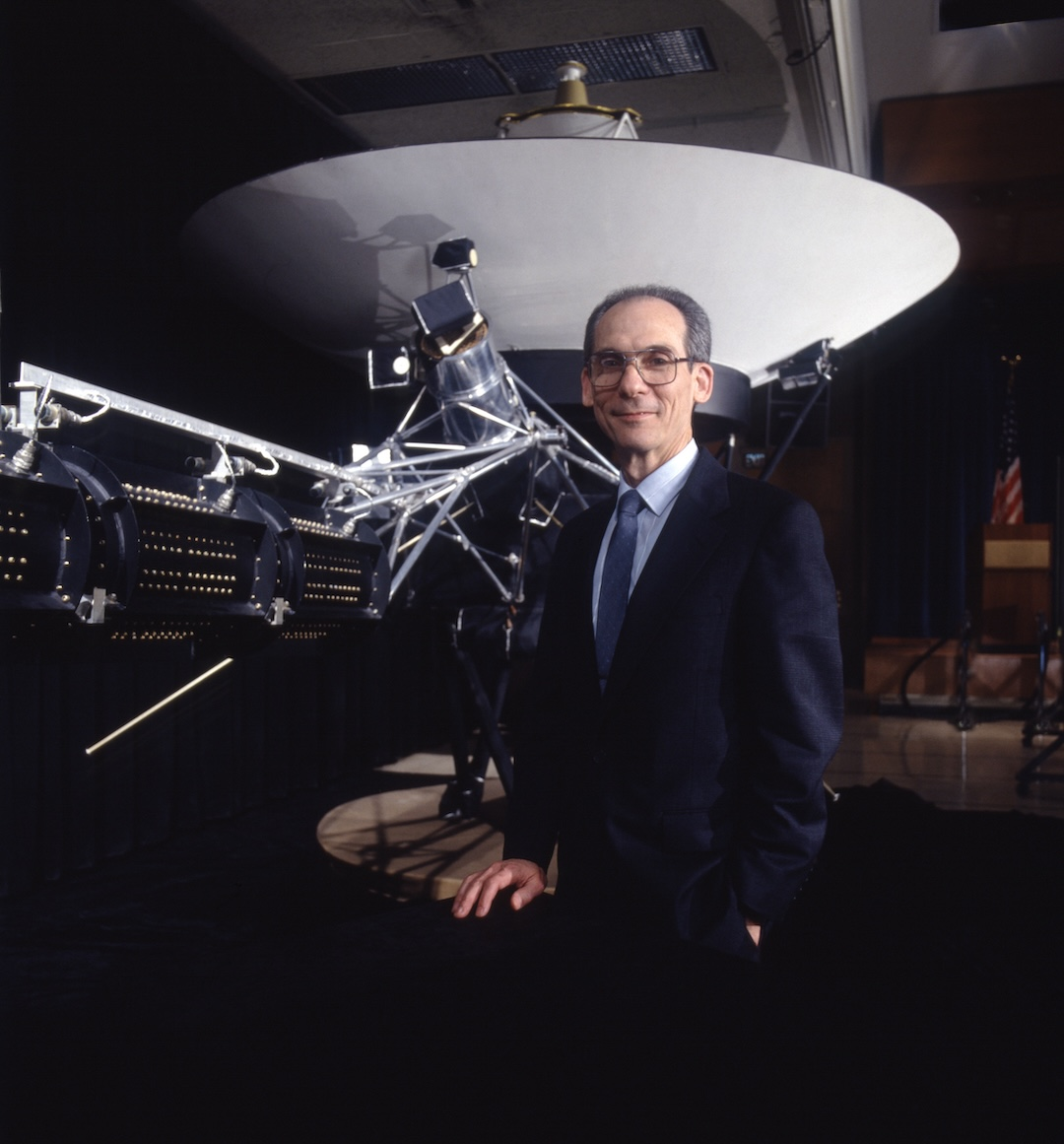
Stone with a Voyager model in 1992

Though Stone is better known as the Voyager's project scientist, he served as a principal investigator for multiple other missions. (Note: Multiple sources, including NASA, often say that Stone was the PI of nine NASA spacecraft missions and co-investigator on five more, but don't list these missions. Stone himself said that "[Before Voyager] My first space mission was in 1961 and I had flown instruments on missions in 1965, '67, '69, '72, and '73 – so I had lots of instruments in space, but they had all been on Earth-orbiters.") He was the PI of the Cosmic Ray Experiment on Orbiting Geophysical Observatory-6 (OGO-6, 1969), the PI of the Electrons and Hydrogen and Helium Isotopes experiments on Interplanetary Monitoring Platform 7 (IMP-7, 1972) and IMP-8 (1973), was involved into the cancelled ASTROMAG (1980s), was the PI of two instruments of the cancelled International Solar Polar Mission (1981), the PI of a heavy-ion counter on the Galileo mission to Jupiter (1989), the PI of SAMPEX (1992), the PI for the Advanced Composition Explorer (1997), and co-investigator of STEREO mission's High Energy Telescope (HET) and Low Energy Telescope (LET) (both part of the In-situ Measurements of Particles and CME Transients (IMPACT) instrument package) (2006). Stone also "oversaw the redesign of the cooling system" on the Spitzer Space Telescope (2003), and was an investigator on the Integrated Science Investigation of the Sun instrument on the Parker Solar Probe (2018).

In 1991, Ed Stone–a well-known, enthusiastic and respectable scientist–was made the JPL director. His directorship was during the difficult period of the 90s: with the Cold War and the Space Race between the US and the USSR finished, NASA saw dwindling budgets and introduced the so-called "faster, better, cheaper" approach, that encouraged smaller, cheaper missions built with the help of third-party contractors, efficiently "commercializing" the research lab and forcing it to work with industry. Cost-cutting had to be done by Stone, who tried to adapt a new management culture at JPL, while at the same time trying not to hurt science. The plans were to downsize the lab and fire around 30% of JPL personnel by the end of the decade; Stone and Caltech leadership even feared that JPL could be closed.

The "faster, better, cheaper" (FBC) approach was described as:

Faster applies to project development time, which for convenience can be defined as the period from project approval to launch. Rapid development cycles help control costs and enable the incorporation of the latest advances in technology, because the design freeze date is closer to the launch date. Better applies to the capability of the flight system as a scientific instrument, improvement here is based on the use of advanced technologies, and on better-focused science based on the knowledge gained from earlier exploration missions. Finally, cheaper denotes both lower cost per mission and, through clever design and use of technology, more effective use of available funds.

JPL had little experience in small missions at the time: its "flagship" missions, like Voyager, Cassini, and Galileo, employed hundreds of people for decades. Cassini, for example, "directly supported maybe 500 work-years, about 10 percent of total lab staff [and] provided close to 20 percent of the lab budget". In order to comply with budget restrictions and save the mission, Cassini was downsized; to save $250 million, the scan platform had to be removed from the plans. Stone himself saw the "faster-better-cheaper" as a cultural change of the lab's engineering practices.

Stone also became a proponent of a management culture change at JPL, and installed Richard Laeser (former Voyager project manager) to apply total quality management (TQM) at all levels. Reorganization was required to meet NASA needs, and TQM "emphasized customer service", even though few people at JPL saw NASA as their customer. Many employees were against the new management practices. (Note: Before TQM and the management changes, project managers at JPL were autonomous and even autocrative: "Project managers were often hard-driving autocrats; as Voyager manager Norm Haynes put it, they "were culled out to be sort of rugged individualists." The otherwise good-natured John Casani, the epitome of the breed, was also known as the "Ayatollah Casani". At one point a consultant gave a personality test to senior managers; at one end of the scale were the counselor types, such as the professorial Stone, and at the other were what Casani called the "leg breakers", including himself.")

The most successful, "model" example of an FBC mission was the Mars Pathfinder lander and the first Mars rover, the Sojourner. The mission cost around 200 million dollars and was widely reported in the press, appearing on the covers of Time and Newsweek. Other missions were less fortunate: in 1998–1999, six missions were launched; four of them failed, including two Mars orbiters. Both JPL (Stone) and the NASA administration (Daniel Goldin) acknowledged that they pushed too far with the FBC; no project manager of the failed missions was fired.

According to Peter J. Westwick, as the director of JPL, Stone was a "cautious revolutionary". He retired in 2001; his successor, Charles Elachi, "felt no need to change JPL's culture".

== Retirement and death ==
Stone retired from Voyager in 2022, after holding the role for 50 years, but remained professor emeritus at Caltech. He died in Pasadena, California, on June 9, 2024, at the age of 88.

== Personal life ==
Stone was a shy man, and worked 100-hour weeks at times. Alan C. Cummings, the Cosmic Ray Subsystem co-investigator, who worked with Stone for fifty years, described him as "very calm ... the smartest guy I ever met. He was a multiplexer supreme." Stone was profiled in 1990 for The New York Times by Michael Norman:

A space scientist has to be a visionary, a poet in a white lab coat who can give voice to our collective craving for adventure, our fascination with a universe we have not been able to touch.

At first sight, Ed Stone is not such a man. As he hurries through the luminous California morning, one hardly notices him, 5 feet 10 inches, 130 pounds, a wisp in gray—gray suit, gray shirt, gray felt shoes (Note: Kurt Streeter observed the same devotion to gray color in 2011, writing "He is wearing his standard work attire: gray sport jacket, gray pants, gray shoes, gray socks—and a white shirt.") – lugging an ancient leather briefcase. He keeps to the shadows and side paths, terra incognita, a physicist so swept up in his daily occasions, so occupied by science, his life appears to turn on little else.

And yet, for the public, Ed Stone has been a kind of Cicero on space. As chief scientist on Project Voyager, he has participated in some 60 public briefings and news conferences over the 13 years of the project.

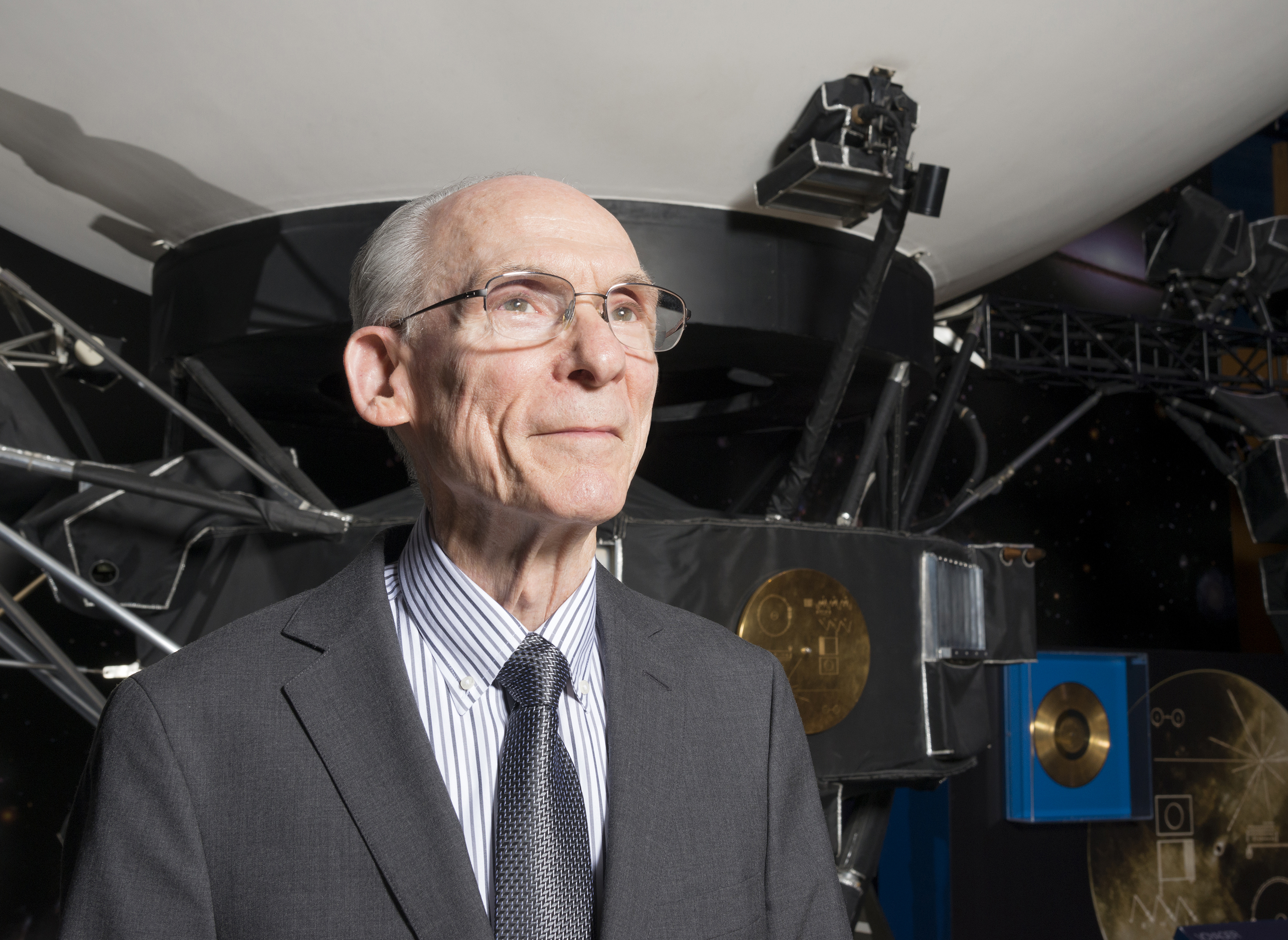
Stone in 2019

Stone met Alice Wickliffe on a blind date at a comedy club and married her in 1962. She died in December 2023. They had two daughters, Susan and Janet. Stone was described as a "shy man, sometimes diffident, often detached"; his younger daughter compared him to Star Trek's Mr. Spock. He had no close friends but "shared a long professional kinship with several scientists". He was a registered Democrat but not very interested in politics. Norman wrote that "He has no interest in sports, no hobbies ... His main recreation is to read a daily newspaper. His favorite food is raisin pie. He is not a man of faith."

The Voyager mission became the longest NASA mission; Stone described it in 2012:

When I started on Voyager my two daughters were young. By the time they were in college we had passed Saturn and were on our way to Uranus. They got married and the Voyagers just kept going, and we had grandchildren and Voyager just kept going and our grandchildren are now aware of what's happening to the Voyagers just like our children were.

Stone was known as "an incredibly fast walker":

The joke was that nobody knew what he really looked like, because when he was coming toward you, he was blueshifted and when he was going away from you, he was redshifted.

— Alan Cummings

Stone appeared in The Farthest, a 2017 documentary on the Voyager program.

== Awards and honors ==
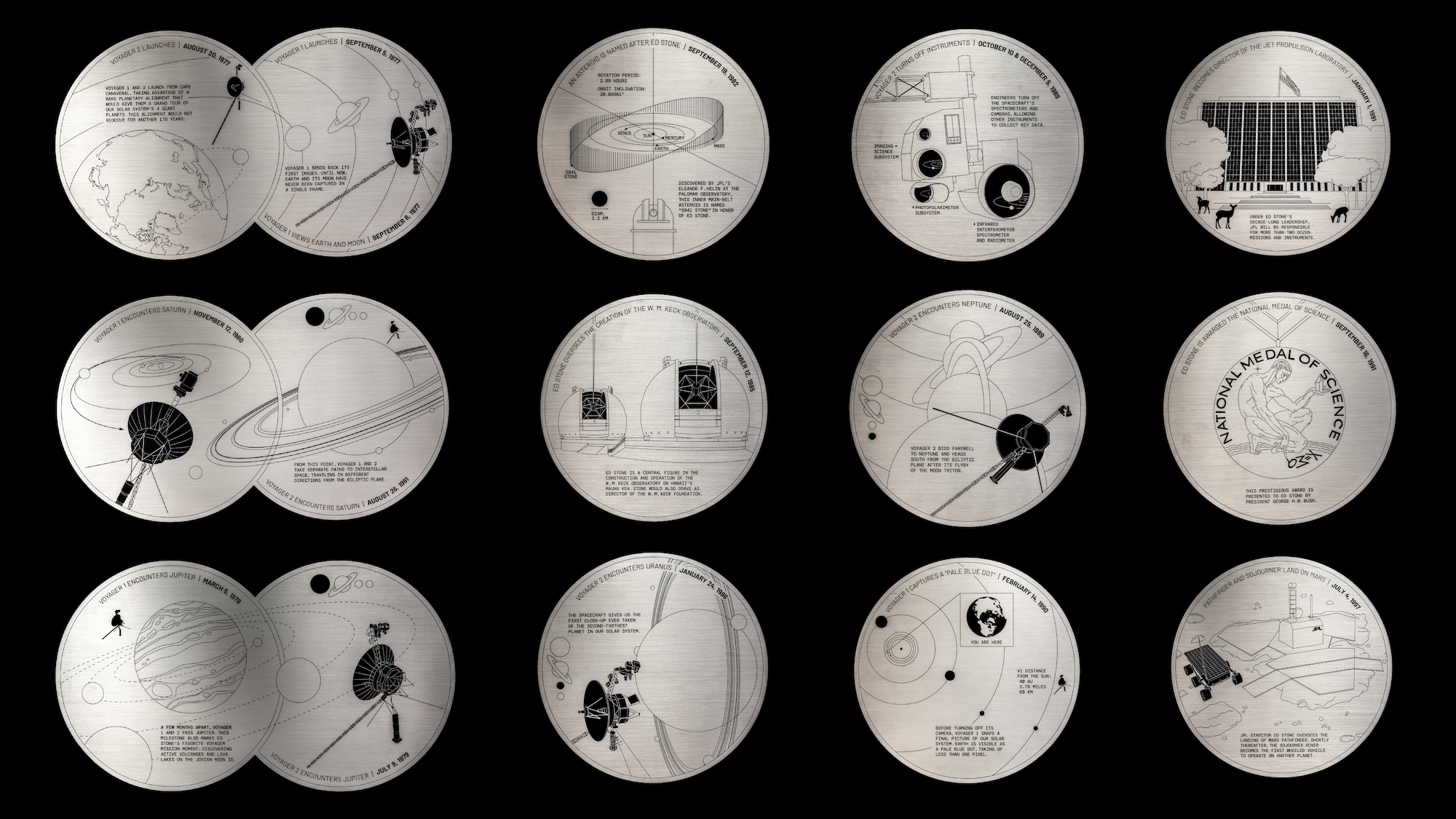
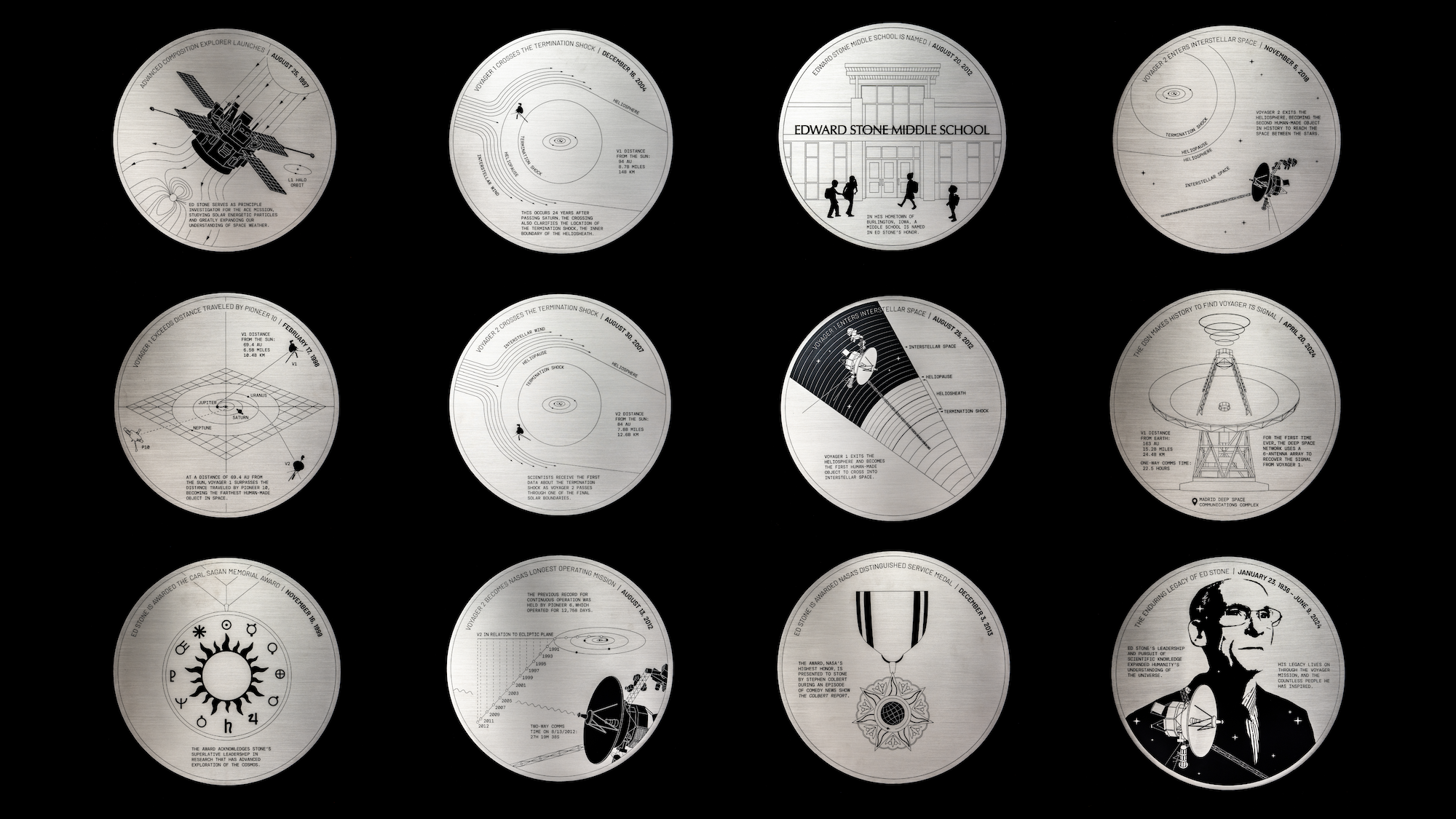
Memorial plaques on the Edward Stone Voyager Exploration Trail at JPL. See more photos on Commons.

In 2002, JPL established the Edward Stone Award for Outstanding Research Publication, which is awarded annually to JPL employees in both science and engineering.

In 2012, a middle school was named in Stone's honor in Burlington, his hometown.

In 2013, Stone was awarded the NASA Distinguished Public Service Medal, the highest NASA award for non-governmental employees. NASA arranged the award ceremony to be performed during The Colbert Report night show, with the award presented by Stephen Colbert dressed in a retrofuturistic spacesuit. Stone was unaware of the award when he came to the show. It was given "for a lifetime of extraordinary scientific achievement and outstanding leadership of space science missions, and for his exemplary sharing of the exciting results with the public."

In 2019, Stone won the Shaw Prize in Astronomy, "for his leadership in the Voyager project". The award included $1.2 million; Stone endowed a summer student program with this money "in return for the wonderful mission [Flandro] discovered".

In 2023, the W. M. Keck Foundation endowed the Edward C. Stone Professorship at Caltech. Christopher Martin, director of Caltech Optical Observatories, became the first Stone Professor.

In 2024, the Edward Stone Voyager Exploration Trail was unveiled at the JPL campus to commemorate Stone and his "penchant for walking". The trail starts at JPL Mall and consists of two paths, made similar to Voyager 1 and 2 trajectories. The trail features 24 memorial plaques, designed to "evoke the Golden Record" commemorating the mission's and Ed Stone's personal milestones.

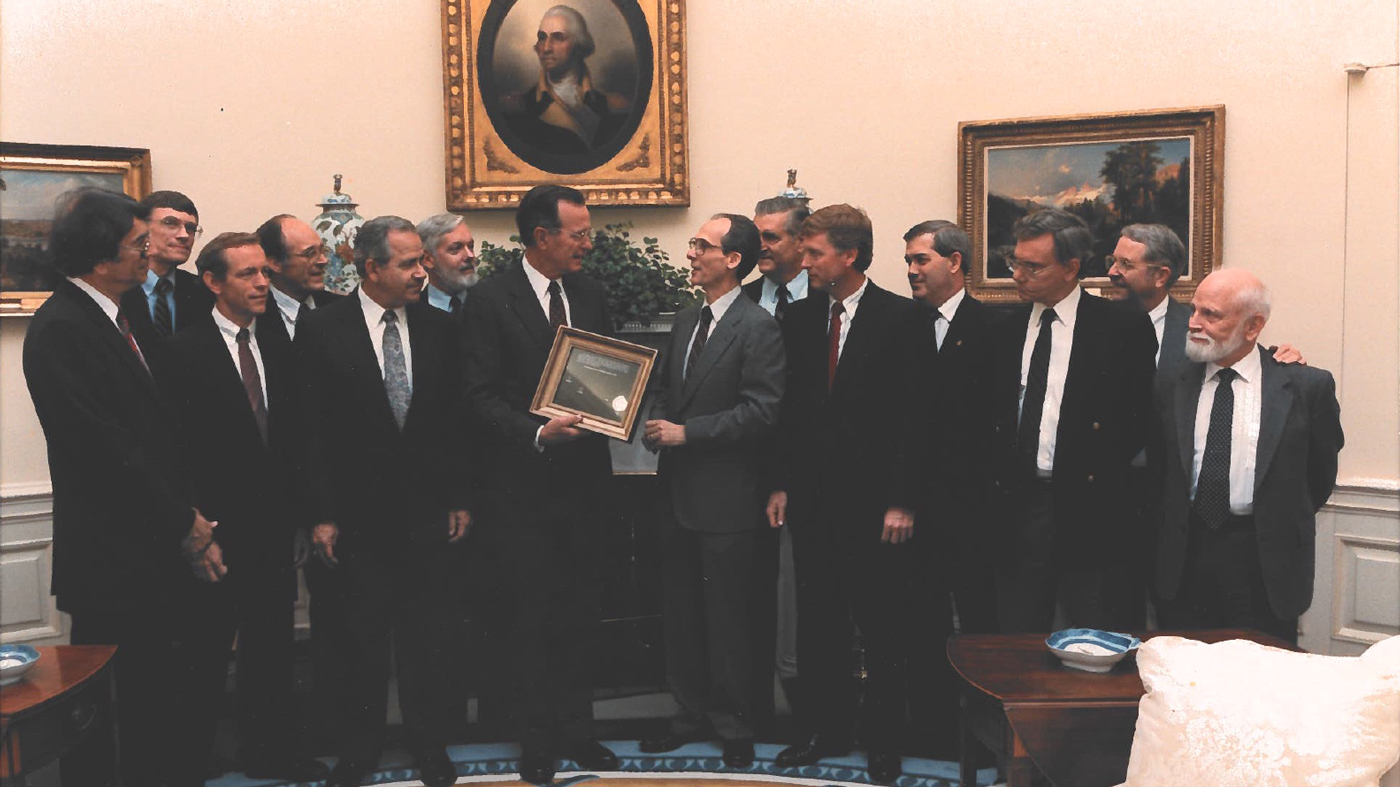
Ed Stone and Voyager mission team members gave a framed copy of an iconic Voyager 1 solar system image that includes Earth as a "Pale Blue Dot" to President George H. W. Bush on June 7, 1990.

List of awards

- 1980 The Collier Trophy on behalf of the Voyager team
- 1984 AIAA Space Science Award
- 1984 Member of the National Academy of Sciences
- 1986 NASA Outstanding Leadership Medal
- 1991 National Medal of Science
- 1992 COSPAR Award
- 1992 Magellanic Premium
- 1992 Golden Plate Award of the American Academy of Achievement
- 1993 Member of the American Philosophical Society
- 1996 Space Flight Award
- 1999 Carl Sagan Memorial Award
- 2006 NASA Exceptional Scientific Achievement Medal
- 2007 Philip J. Klass Award for Lifetime Achievement
- 2011 AIAA Goddard Astronautics Award
- 2013 NASA Distinguished Public Service Medal
- 2013 IAF World Space Award
- 2013 Ó Ceallaigh Medal
- 2014 Howard Hughes Memorial Award
- 2014 a lifetime achievement award of the American Astronautical Society "for sustained and extraordinary contributions to America's space programs, including innovative planetary missions in support of unmanned exploration of the solar system"
- 2015 The Alumni Medal of the University of Chicago
- 2019 Shaw Prize in Astronomy
- 2022 Benjamin Franklin Medal
- Minor planet 5841 Stone is named after him.

== Selected publications ==
- Stone, E. C.; Lane, A. L. (June 1, 1979). "Voyager 1 Encounter with the Jovian System". Science. 204 (4396): 945–948. Bibcode:1979Sci...204..945S. doi:10.1126/science.204.4396.945. PMID 17800428.
- Stone, E. C. (September 30, 1981). "The Voyager Mission Through the Jupiter Encounters". Journal of Geophysical Research. 86 (A10): 8123–8124. Bibcode:1981JGR....86.8123S. doi:10.1029/JA086iA10p08123.
- Stone, E. C.; Miner, E. D. (October 30, 1991). "The Voyager Encounter with Neptune". Journal of Geophysical Research Supplement. 96: 18, 903–18, 906.
- Selesnick, R. S.; Stone, E. C. (1992). "Energetic Particle Signatures of Satellites and Rings in Neptune's Magnetosphere". Advances in Space Research. 12 (11): 71–79. Bibcode:1992AdSpR..12k..71S. doi:10.1016/0273-1177(92)90424-V.
- Cummings, A. C.; Stone, E. C.; Webber, W. R. (September 1, 1993). "Estimate of the Distance to the Solar Wind Termination Shock from Gradients of Anomalous Cosmic Ray Oxygen". Journal of Geophysical Research. 98 (A9): 15, 165–15, 168. Bibcode:1993JGR....9815165C. doi:10.1029/93JA01173.
- Mewaldt, R. A.; Cummings, J. R.; Cummings, A. C.; Leske, R. A.; Stone, E. C.; Von Rosenvinge, T. T. (June 30, 1995). Sampex Studies of Anomalous Cosmic Rays Using the Geomagnetic Field. International Solar Wind 8 Conference.
- Garrard, T. L.; Stone, E. C.; Murphy, N. (1996). "Effects of Absorption by Io on Composition of Energetic Heavy Ions". Science. 274 (5286): 393–394. Bibcode:1996Sci...274..393G. doi:10.1126/science.274.5286.393. PMID 8832881.
- Wiedenbeck, M. E.; Christian, E. R.; Cook, W. R.; Cummings, A. C.; Dougherty, B. L.; Leske, R. A.; Mewaldt, R. A.; Stone, E. C.; Rosenvinge, T. T. (1996). "Two-dimensional position-sensitive silicon detectors for the ACE Solar Isotope Spectrometer". In Ramsey, Brian D.; Parnell, Thomas A. (eds.). Gamma-Ray and Cosmic-Ray Detectors, Techniques, and Missions. Proceedings of SPIE. Vol. 2806. pp. 176–187. doi:10.1117/12.253977.
- Stone, E. C.; Cohen, C. M. S.; Cook, W. R.; Cummings, A. C.; Gauld, B.; Kecman, B.; Leske, R. A.; Mewaldt, R. A.; Thayer, M. R.; Dougherty, B. L. (1998). "The Cosmic-Ray Isotope Spectrometer for the Advanced Composition Explorer". Space Science Reviews. 86 (1–4): 285–356. Bibcode:1998SSRv...86..285S. doi:10.1023/A:1005075813033.
- Stone, E. C.; Cohen, C. M. S.; Cook, W. R.; Cummings, A. C.; Gauld, B.; Kecman, B.; Leske, R. A.; Mewaldt, R. A.; Thayer, M. R.; Dougherty, B. L. (1998). "The Solar Isotope Spectrometer for the Advanced Composition Explorer". Space Science Reviews. 86 (1–4): 357–408. Bibcode:1998SSRv...86..357S. doi:10.1023/A:1005027929871.
- Stone, E. C. (1999). "Communications Technologies for Space Exploration". Proceedings of the IEEE. 87 (6): 1044–1046. doi:10.1109/5.763318.
- Wiedenbeck, M. E.; Binns, W. R.; Christian, E. R.; Cummings, A. C.; Dougherty, B. L.; Hink, P. L.; Klarmann, J.; Leske, R. A.; Lijowski, M.; Mewaldt, R. A.; Stone, E. C.; Thayer, M. R.; Von Rosenvinge, T. T.; Yanasak, N. E. (1999). "Constraints on the Time Delay between Nucleosynthesis and Cosmic-Ray Acceleration from Observations of ^{59}Ni and ^{59}Co". Astrophysical Journal Letters. 523 (1): L61–L64. Bibcode:1999ApJ...523L..61W. doi:10.1086/312242.
- Cohen, C. M. S.; Cummings, A. C.; Leske, R. A.; Mewaldt, R. A.; Stone, E. C.; Dougherty, B. L.; Wiedenbeck, M. E.; Christian, E. R.; Von Rosenvinge, T. T. (1999). "Inferred Charge States of High Energy Solar Particles from the Solar Isotope Spectrometer on Ace". Geophysical Research Letters. 26 (2): 149–152. Bibcode:1999GeoRL..26..149C. doi:10.1029/1998GL900218.
- Leske, R. A.; Cohen, C. M. S.; Cummings, A. C.; Mewaldt, R. A.; Stone, E. C.; Dougherty, B. L.; Wiedenbeck, M. E.; Christian, E. R.; Von Rosenvinge, T. T. (1999). "Unusual Isotopic Composition of Solar Energetic Particles Observed in the November 6, 1997 Event". Geophysical Research Letters. 26 (2): 153–156. Bibcode:1999GeoRL..26..153L. doi:10.1029/1998GL900173.
- Leske, R. A.; Mewaldt, R. A.; Cohen, C. M. S.; Cummings, A. C.; Stone, E. C.; Wiedenbeck, M. E.; Christian, E. R.; Von Rosenvinge, T. T. (1999). "Event-to-Event Variations in the Isotopic Composition of Neon in Solar Energetic Particle Events". Geophysical Research Letters. 26 (17): 2693–2696. Bibcode:1999GeoRL..26.2693L. doi:10.1029/1999GL900561.
- Cohen, C. M. S.; Mewaldt, R. A.; Leske, R. A.; Cummings, A. C.; Stone, E. C.; Wiedenbeck, M. E.; Christian, E. R.; Von Rosenvinge, T. T. (1999). "New Observations of Heavy-Ion-Rich Solar Particle Events from Ace". Geophysical Research Letters. 26 (17): 2697–2700. Bibcode:1999GeoRL..26.2697C. doi:10.1029/1999GL900560.
- Cohen, C. M. S.; Garrard, T. L.; Stone, E. C.; Cooper, J. F.; Murphy, N.; Gehrels, N. (April 1, 2000). "Io Encounters Past and Present - a Heavy Ion Comparison". Journal of Geophysical Research. 105 (A4): 7775–7782. Bibcode:2000JGR...105.7775C. doi:10.1029/1999JA000021.
- Stone, E. C. (2000). "Mars and the Search for Life Elsewhere - Innovations in the Third Era of Space Exploration". AIAA Student Journal. 38 (1): 4–7.
- Stone, Edward C. (2010). "Voyager's Journey to the Edge of Interstellar Space". Forging the Future of Space Science: The Next 50 Years. Washington, DC: The National Academies Press. pp. 109–117. doi:10.17226/12675. ISBN 978-0-309-13946-5.
- Rankin, J. S.; Stone, E. C.; Cummings, A. C.; McComas, D. J.; Lal, N.; Heikkila, B. C. (March 1, 2019). "Galactic Cosmic-Ray Anisotropies: Voyager 1 in the Local Interstellar Medium". The Astrophysical Journal. 873 (1): 46. arXiv:1905.11990. Bibcode:2019ApJ...873...46R. doi:10.3847/1538-4357/ab041f.
- Zank, G. P.; Sterken, V.; Giacalone, J.; Möbius, E.; von Steiger, R.; Stone, E. S.; Krimigis, S. M.; Richardson, J. D.; Linsky, J.; Izmodenov, V.; Heber, B. (June 2022). "The Early History of Heliospheric Science and the Spacecraft That Made It Possible". Space Science Reviews. 218 (4): 34. Bibcode:2022SSRv..218...34Z. doi:10.1007/s11214-022-00900-8. PMC 9132875. PMID 35645425.

== Notes ==
Academic offices
Preceded by Lew Allen, Jr.	7th Director of the Jet Propulsion Laboratory; 1991–2001	Succeeded by Charles Elachi
