= "Faster, better, cheaper" approach =

NASA management philosophy

The "faster, better, cheaper" approach (FBC) was a management philosophy adopted by NASA under Administrator Daniel Goldin (1992–2001). Following the end of the Cold War and facing budget constraints, NASA sought to reduce mission costs and development time while maintaining scientific capabilities through smaller, more focused missions and increased use of commercial technologies.

== History ==
NASA had a difficult period in the 1990s: with the Cold War and the Space Race between the US and the USSR finished, the agency saw dwindling budgets, and the new NASA administrator, Daniel Goldin, introduced the so-called "faster, better, cheaper" approach in 1992, which encouraged smaller, cheaper missions built with the help of third-party contractors, efficiently "commercializing" the research labs and forcing them to work with industry. Goldin had experience with small satellites, and especially disliked long, expensive programmes, calling them "battlestar galacticas", like the Cassini mission that he threatened to cancel, and urged for development of small and fast missions. The FBC approach was compared and likely originated from Lockheed Martin's skunk works approach developed by Kelly Johnson. Though it was promoted by NASA and was a de facto operational paradigm during Goldin's tenure, FBC was not institutionalized into NASA policies, being only a set of unwritten ideas.

The "faster, better, cheaper" approach was described as:

Faster applies to project development time, which for convenience can be defined as the period from project approval to launch. Rapid development cycles help control costs and enable the incorporation of the latest advances in technology, because the design freeze date is closer to the launch date. Better applies to the capability of the flight system as a scientific instrument, improvement here is based on the use of advanced technologies, and on better-focused science based on the knowledge gained from earlier exploration missions. Finally, cheaper denotes both lower cost per mission and, through clever design and use of technology, more effective use of available funds.

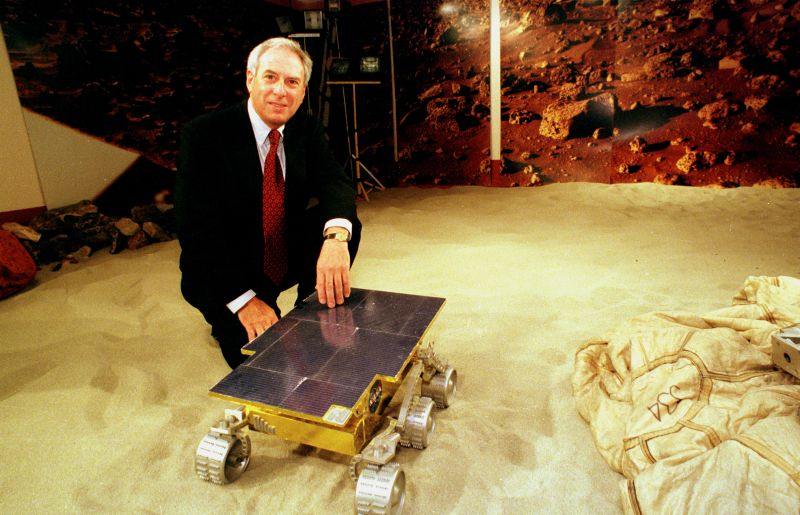
NASA Administrator Daniel Goldin poses with the Sojourner rover from the Mars Pathfinder mission. The mission is the best-known, "model" example of the FBC.

In 1991, Edward C. Stone–a well-known, enthusiastic and respectable scientist, the project scientist of Voyager program–was made the Jet Propulsion Laboratory (JPL) director. JPL had little experience in small missions at the time: its "flagship" missions, like Voyager, Cassini, and Galileo, employed hundreds of people for decades. Cassini, for example, "directly supported maybe 500 work-years, about 10 percent of total lab staff [and] provided close to 20 percent of the lab budget". In order to comply with budget restrictions and save the mission, Cassini was downsized; to save $250 million, the scan platform had to be removed from the plans. Stone himself saw the "faster-better-cheaper" as a cultural change of the lab's engineering practices.

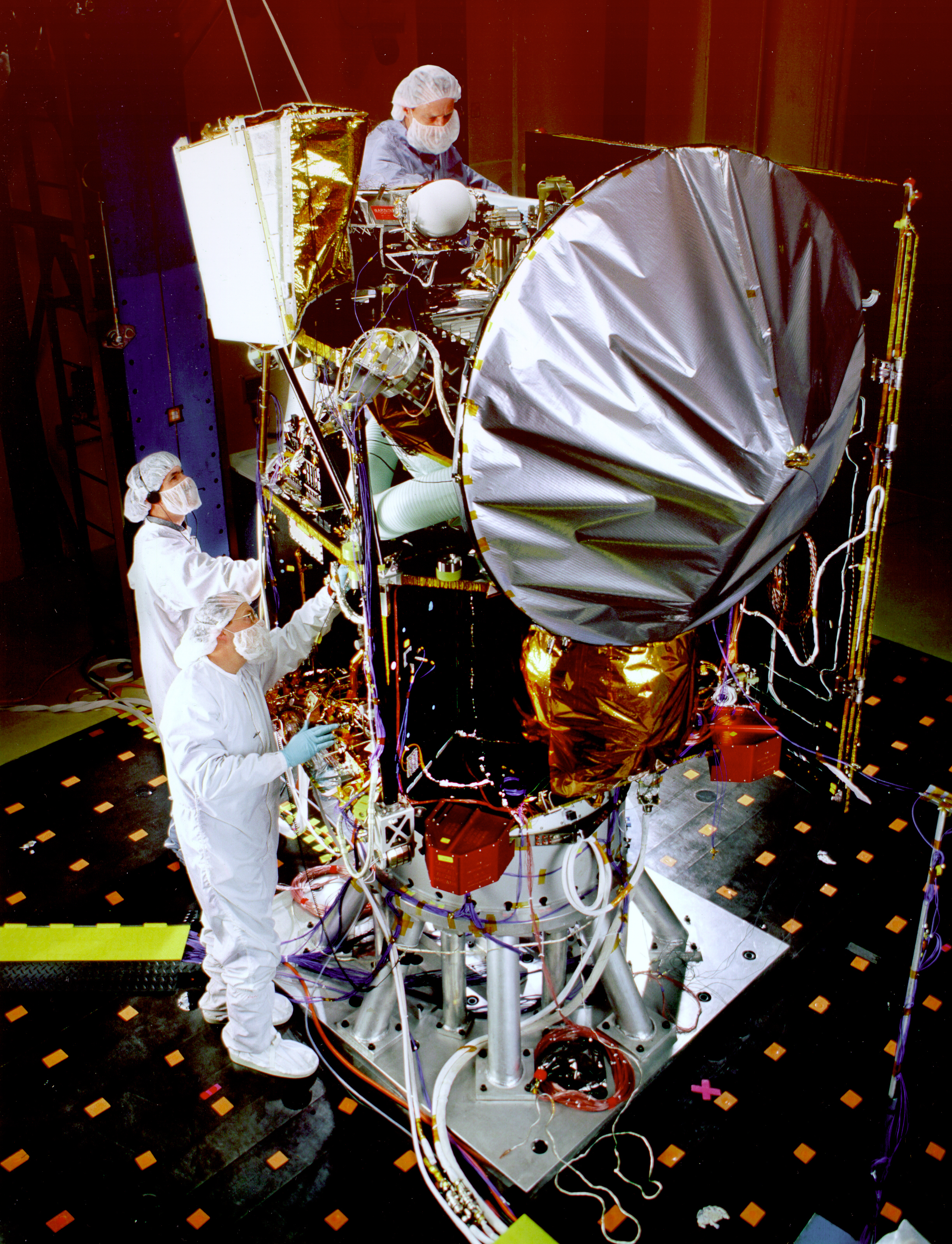
Mars Climate Orbiter undergoing acoustic testing. The mission failed because of a metric/imperial units error.

The most successful, "model" example of the FBC was the Mars Pathfinder lander and the first Mars rover, the Sojourner. The mission cost around 200 million dollars and was widely reported in the press, appearing on the covers of Time and Newsweek. FBC also promoted the usage of commercial off-the-shelf hardware and software in spacecraft; for example using commercial CPUs instead of specialized radiation hardened ones usually used in spacecraft. This approach was successfully used for the Sojourner.

Other missions were less fortunate: in 1998–1999, six missions were launched; four of them failed. Both JPL (Stone) and the NASA administration (Goldin) acknowledged that they pushed too far with the FBC; no project manager of the failed missions was fired. Goldin took all the blame, speaking at a press conference at JPL after two Mars mission failures:

I asked these people to do incredibly tough things, to push the limits. We were successful and I asked them to push harder and we hit a boundary. And I told them they should not apologize. They did terrific things and I pushed it too hard. And that's why I feel responsible.

After Mars Climate Orbiter, Mars Polar Lander, and Deep Space 2 failures, a governmental commission, the Mars Program Independent Assessment Team, was created to investigate the issues that led to it. The commission issued a Mars Program Independent Assessment Team Report, commonly known as the Young Report after its chairman Tom Young.

After two Mars spacecraft failed, "the Mars program had retrenched and returned to more conservative and traditional management with significantly more funding": the next mission, Mars Exploration Rover (launched in 2003), was redesigned, and eventually cost around $800 million; as Norman Haynes put it, MER sucked up "all available money from NASA and JPL".

The Goddard Space Flight Center operated the Small Explorer Project (SMEX) under the FBC; in 2001, five satellites were operational with just one instrument anomaly.

Because of the FBC, NASA's Spitzer Space Telescope was "forced" to change, resulting in "simplified instruments, solar orbit and warm-launch architecture".

== Assessment and legacy ==
The "Faster, better, cheaper" philosophy is often criticized, with many opponents saying that one can only "pick two" out of three desired qualities. However, even its critics acknowledge that under Goldin the flight rate became higher, and that Goldin "rescued space science from the tedium and inherent risk of flying one giant mission every five or ten years". The FBC philosophy was noted by multiple authors to be a success by different criteria.

The FBC missions had strict budgets. Mars Pathfinder, together with the Sojourner rover, cost only 6.7 percent of what was spent on the Viking mission. All 16 missions launched in the FBC era cost less than Cassini. Dan Ward from the US Air Force concludes that "FBC delivered 10 successful missions (plus six unsuccessful ones) for less than the price of one traditional mission. ... suggest that success-per-dollar is a more meaningful measurement of achievement than success-per-attempt because there is no limit to the number of attempts we can make" and writes that FBC "reveals an admirable record of success".

Another metric which shows that FBC was a successful approach is "the science output per dollar of mission cost": "FBC missions resulted in more scientific publications (and citation-weighted publications) per dollar of mission cost than did missions developed under other paradigms". Dillon and Madsen, 2014 concludes that "NASA suffers from a bias against learning from the FBC era because of the stigma of the failed projects".

Giovanni F. Bignami wrote that the "popular belief" is wrong to target the FBC approach, and shows that the percentage of failed missions was not much lower before FBC than during the FBC.

Larry J. Paxton thought that FBC "did revitalize science at NASA": during the Goldin administration there were many missions in contrast with the "flagship" Voyager and Galileo. New NASA programs were created, including the Discovery program and Living With a Star. He also wrote that FBC proves that large organizations like NASA can be changed and adapted to the needs of its "customers": "For NASA, that customer base included politicians, scientists, and the public."

Howard E. McCurdy writes that "history may view Goldin's administration as a bold first step towards displacing an inappropriate and unsustainable culture of uncontrolled spending on space".

Daniel Goldin was NASA administrator under three presidents, from 1992 to 2001, the longest tenure of all NASA directors. According to W. Henry Lambright, "he was hailed at one point as a miracle worker and poster boy of government reinvention for his 'faster, better, cheaper' strategy of 'doing more with less'. But Goldin left the agency under fire for cost overruns and reforms that reached too far".

== Influence on other agencies ==
Though ESA never adopted NASA's FBC, the agency was also looking into low-cost missions in the early 2000s. The first European planetary mission, the Mars Express orbiter and the Beagle 2 lander, cost only $60 million, and had a "streamlined design and thrift [which] echoes a previous NASA mantra: 'faster, better, cheaper'". ESA described it as "the first example of ESA's new style of developing scientific missions: faster, smarter and more cost-effective, but without compromising reliability and quality". ESA stated that "there was immense pressure on ESA from its Members States to demonstrate similar principles" to FBC. ESA science director David Southwood adapted the FBC as "faster, smarter, cheaper". The orbiter mission succeeded, but the lander failed.

European smallsats PROBA were designed according to the FBC principles; the first satellite, PROBA-1, was launched in 2001.

In 1997, ESA proposed to "radically restructure" the Horizon 2000 program "to make missions faster and cheaper".

Takahiro Yamada of JAXA wrote positively of the FBC approach: ""Far faster, far better, far cheaper” may be difficult, but “a little faster, a little better, a little cheaper” must be within the scope of our endeavors."

== Missions ==
Sources usually mention 16 missions launched during the FBC era, though several more missions are also attributed to it by others.

Mission Name	Program	Operator	Launch Date	Budget (million USD)	Operation Period	Outcome	Notes	Refs.
Clementine	DSPSE	BMDO / NRL	25 January 1994	~$75	1994	Success	Completed global lunar mapping; planned fly-by of 1620 Geographos cancelled after attitude failure. Mission became the basis of FBC.	
SAMPEX	SMEX	GSFC	July 3, 1992	~$55	1992–2004	Success	First SMEX mission, studied cosmic rays and magnetospheric particles	
NEAR Shoemaker	Discovery	APL/JHU	February 17, 1996	$110–150	1996–2001	Success	First spacecraft to orbit and land on an asteroid.	
Mars Pathfinder and the Sojourner rover	Discovery	JPL	December 4, 1996	$280	1996–1997	Success	First Mars rover, 85 days operation.	
Mars Global Surveyor	Mars Surveyor	JPL	November 7, 1996	$154	1996–2006	Success	9+ years of Mars mapping, 240,000+ images.	
FAST	SMEX	GSFC	August 21, 1996	~$35	1996–2009	Success	Auroral research, exceeded design life.	
Lewis	Small Satellite Technology Initiative	NASA Glenn/TRW	August 23, 1997	~$62	Failed 3 days post-launch	Failure	Attitude control system failure.	
Clark	Small Satellite Technology Initiative	NASA Stennis	Planned 1997	~$60	Canceled February 1998	Canceled	SSTI program termination.	
Lunar Prospector	Discovery	NASA Ames	January 6, 1998	$62.8	1998–1999	Success	Found evidence of lunar water ice.	
Deep Space 1	New Millennium	JPL	October 24, 1998	~$150	1998–2001	Success	Technology demonstration, ion propulsion.	
Mars Climate Orbiter	Mars Surveyor	JPL	December 11, 1998	$125	1998–1999	Failure	Lost due to metric/imperial units error.	
SWAS	SMEX	GSFC	December 5, 1998	~$70	1998–2008	Success	Submillimeter astronomy observations.	
TRACE	SMEX	GSFC	April 1, 1998	~$75	1998–2010	Success	Solar corona imaging and research.	
Stardust	Discovery	JPL/Lockheed Martin	February 7, 1999	~$200	1999–2011	Success	First comet sample return mission.	
Deep Space 2	New Millennium	JPL	January 3, 1999	$28	1999	Failure	Lost with Mars Polar Lander.	
Mars Polar Lander	Mars Surveyor	JPL	January 3, 1999	$165	1999	Failure	Lost during landing attempt.	
WIRE	SMEX	GSFC	March 4, 1999	~$80	1999	Failure	Premature ejection of telescope cover.	
TERRIERS	Explorers Program	Boston University	May 18, 1999	~$6.1	Failed after launch	Failure	Attitude control system failure, lost power.	
Genesis	Discovery	JPL / Lockheed Martin	8 August 2001	$264	2001–2004	Partial success	Collected solar-wind samples; return capsule parachute failed—samples still largely recovered.	
CONTOUR	Discovery	APL / JHU	3 July 2002	~$159	2002	Failure	Lost contact after solid-rocket motor burn; spacecraft presumed destroyed.	
