= Cosmic Ray Subsystem =

Instrument aboard the Voyager 1 and Voyager 2 spacecraft

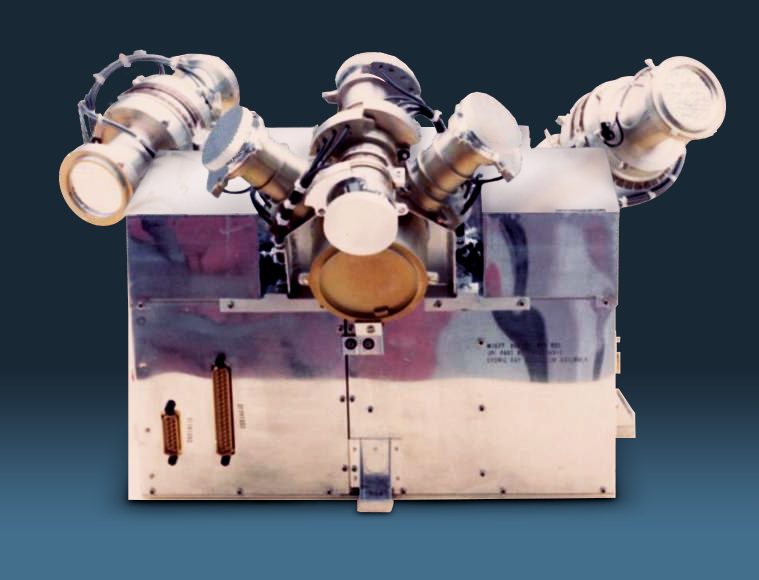
Cosmic Ray Subsystem (CRS)

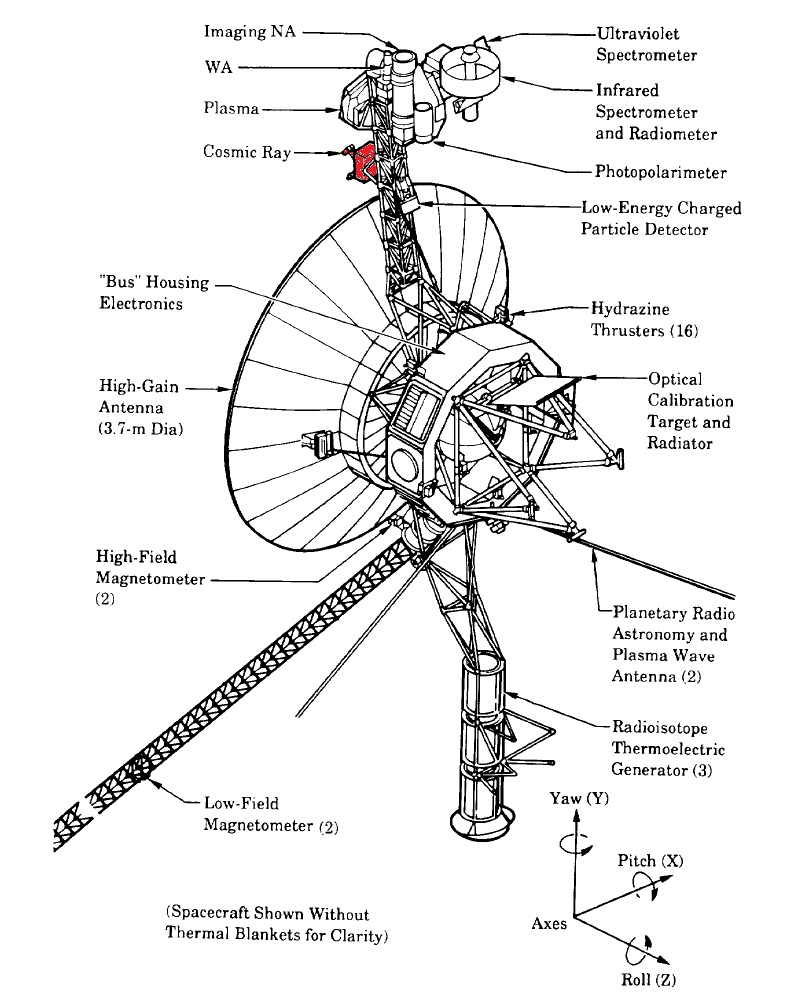
CRS highlighted in red (near the top of the sketch)

Cosmic Ray Subsystem (CRS, or Cosmic Ray System) is an instrument aboard the Voyager 1 and Voyager 2 spacecraft of the NASA Voyager program, and it is an experiment to detect cosmic rays. The CRS includes a High-Energy Telescope System (HETS), Low-Energy Telescope System (LETS), and The Electron Telescope (TET). It is designed to detect energetic particles and some of the requirements were for the instrument to be reliable and to have enough charge resolution. It can also detect the energetic particles like protons from the Galaxy or Earth's Sun.

As of 2019, CRS is one of the active remaining instruments on both Voyager spacecraft. It is described by as being able to detect electrons from 3–110 MeV and cosmic ray nuclei 1–500 MeV/n. All three systems used solid-state detectors. CRS is one of the five fields and particle experiments on each spacecraft. One of the goals is to gain a deeper understanding of the solar wind. Other objects of study including electrons and nuclei from planetary magnetospheres and from outside the Solar System.

In the summer of 2019, the heater for the CRS on Voyager 2 was turned off to save power; however, although it cooled off, it was still returning data at a new lower temperature outside its original operating range. The amount of power on the Voyager spacecraft has been slowly decreasing, so various items of equipment are turned off to save power.

== Overview ==
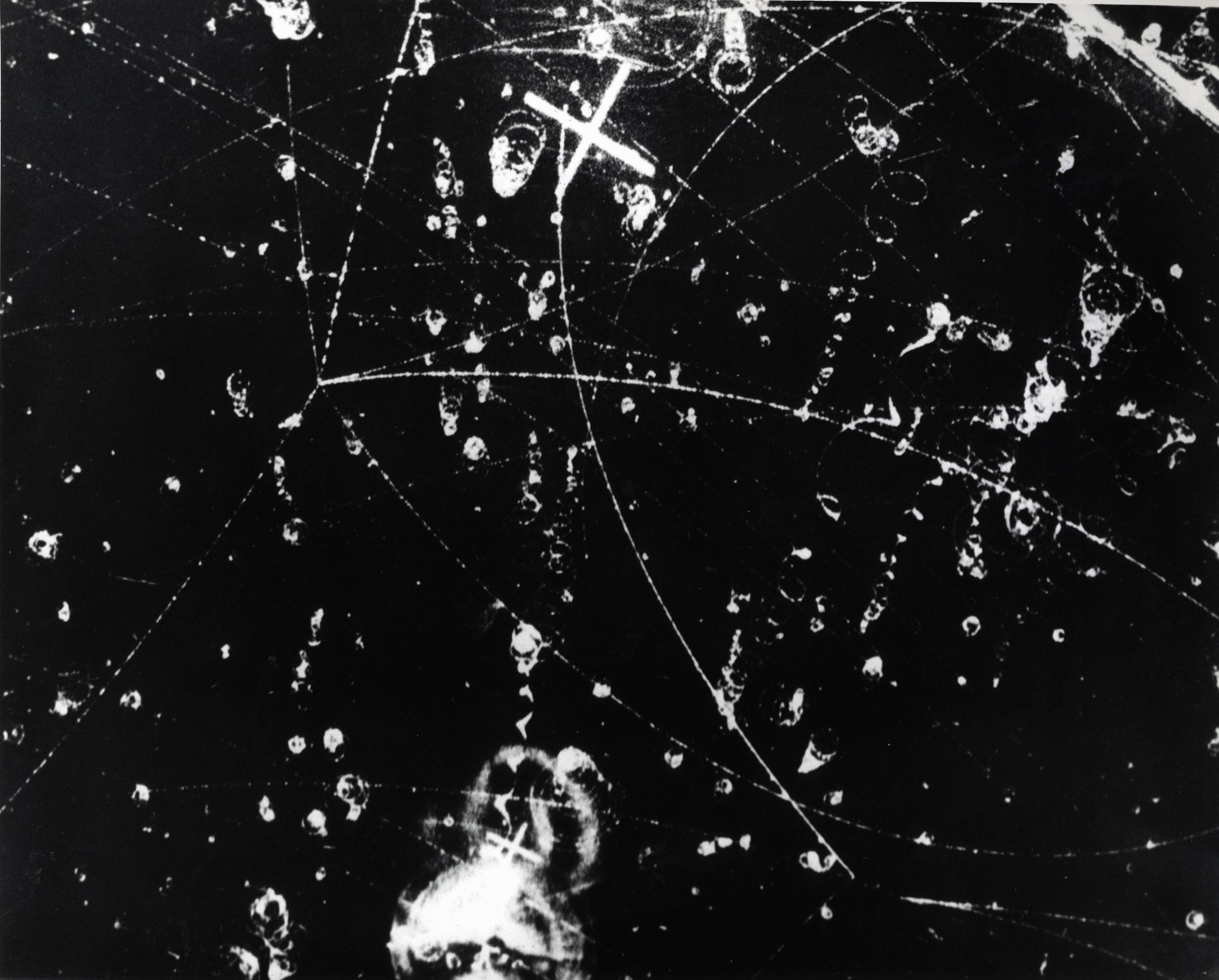
The CRS is detecting extremely small particles as might be detected in a bubble chamber or cloud chamber, which can show the tracks certain particles make as they travel because they trigger little bubbles despite being of atomic size.

Areas of original study for this investigation:

- origin and acceleration process, life history, and dynamic contribution of interstellar cosmic rays
- nucleosynthesis of elements in cosmic-ray sources
- behavior of cosmic rays in the interplanetary medium
- trapped planetary energetic particle environment.

High-Energy Telescope System:

- 6 and 500 MeV/nucleon for atomic numbers from 1 through 30
- electrons from 3 and 100 MeV.

Low-Energy Telescope System:

- 0.15 and 30 MeV/nucleon for atomic numbers from 1 to 30
- measures anisotropies of electrons and nuclei.

Electron Telescope (TET):

- the TET measures the energy spectrum of electrons from 3 to 110 MeV.

The TET consists of eight solid-state detectors with different thicknesses of tungsten between each detector. The detectors and tungsten layers are stacked one on top of each other. The tungsten layers range from 0.56 mm to 2.34 mm thick and function as absorbers. Each TET solid state detector has an area of 4.5 cm^{2} and is 3 mm thick.

Principal investigators: Rochus Eugen Vogt, Edward C. Stone, Alan C. Cummings

The CRS was tested to operate down to a temperature of minus 49 degrees F (minus 59 degrees C) during its development in the 1970s.

== Operating temperature ==
During its development, the CRS was rated to operate down to a temperature of minus 49 degrees F (minus 45 degrees C). Up until 2019 the instrument was operating on both Voyager 1 and Voyager 2, however in the summer of 2019 there was need to save some power on Voyager 2. The heater for the CRS was turned off at this time, which caused a lowering of the CRS temperature to drop below its lowest rated operating temperature. The device cooled down to minus 74 degrees Fahrenheit (minus 59 degrees Celsius), but it continued to operate at this temperature.

== Results ==
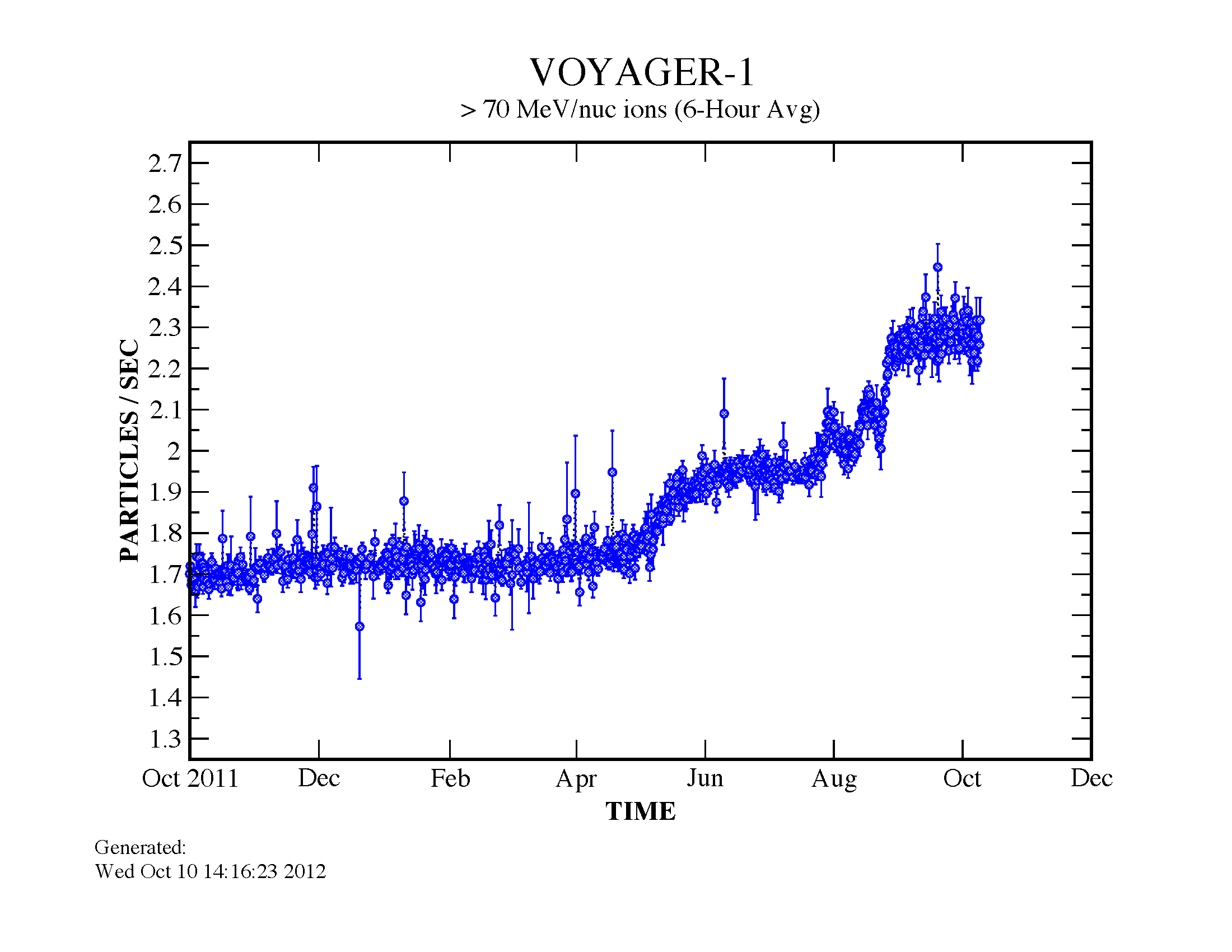
This shows cosmic ray hits as recorded by Voyager 1 from 2011–2012, a time when it is thought to have finally exited the Heliosphere

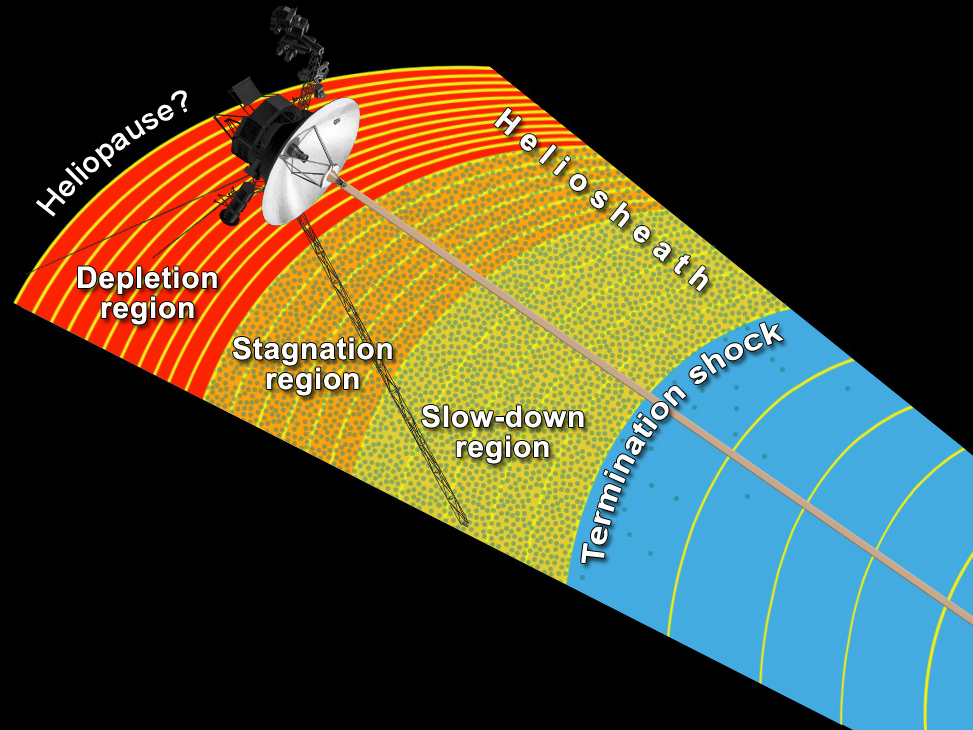
A view of the outer Solar System as discovered by Voyager as of June 2013

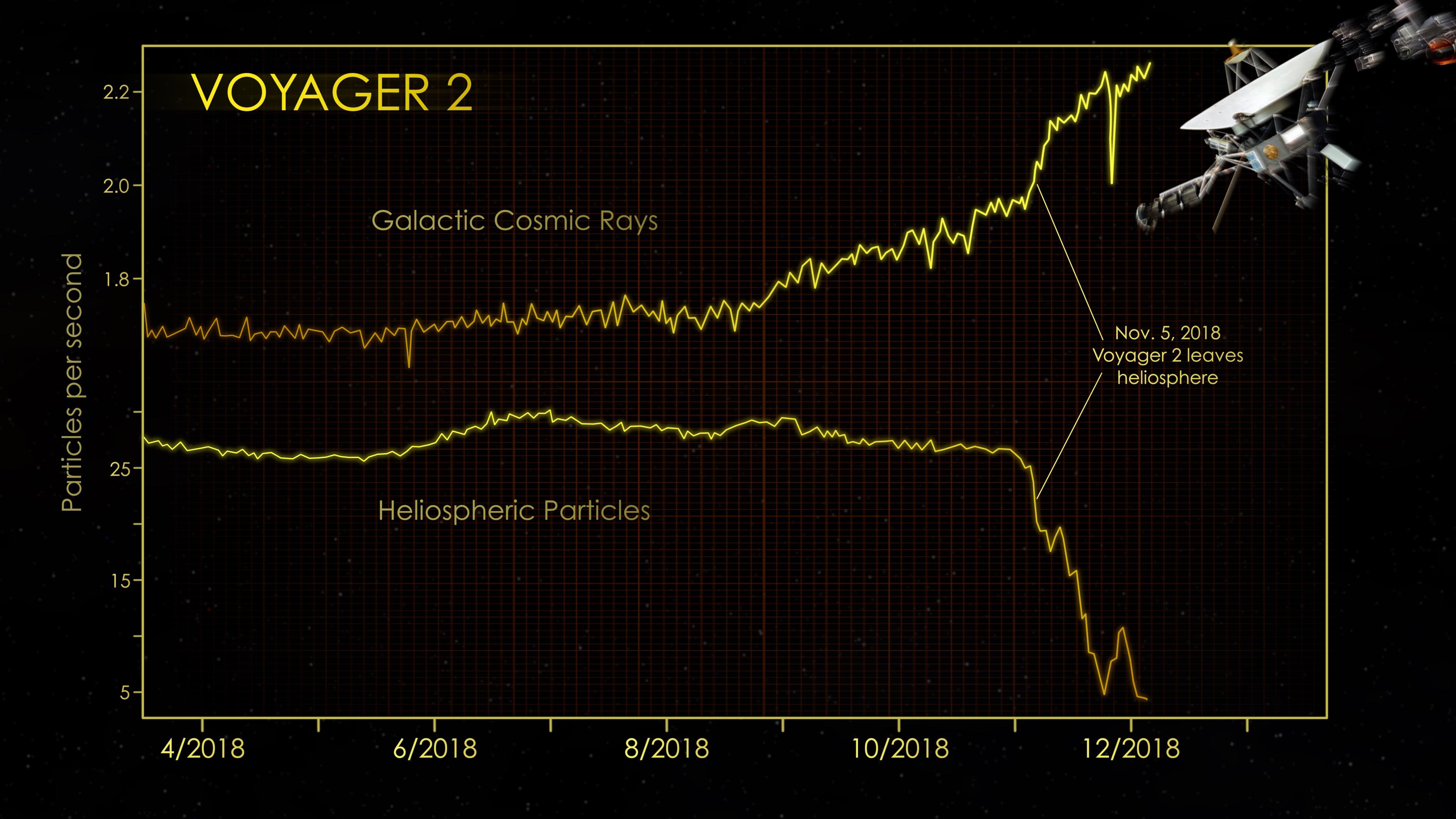
Voyager 2 is reported as leaving the heliosphere on November 5, 2018.

In 1977, the spectra of helium, carbon, nitrogen, oxygen, and neon during the solar minimum were measured using the CRS instrument on the Voyagers that year. The solar minimum of 1977 occurred towards the end of year. It was possible to observe both interplanetary, galactic, and anomalous energy spectra.

In the early 1980s, the CRS detected charged particles around Saturn. It detected a 0.43 million volt flux of protons as it traveled through Saturn's magnetosphere. In the 1980s the CRS data from both Voyagers was used to determine the abundances of energetic particles from the Sun and additional information. Another area studied in the 1980s using CRS data was variation in galactic cosmic rays in the outer Heliosphere

CRS helped predict that Voyager 1 and 2 would cross the Solar System's termination shock in 2003. This helped support the later conclusion that Voyager 1 crossed the termination shock in December 2004 and that Voyager 2 crossed it in August 2007.

In 2011, CRS data along with the Voyager Magnetometer discovered an area where the solar wind was not going in either direction. The area was identified as a sort of charged particle doldrums, where the particles from the Solar System are pushed back by cosmic forces. At a distance of 17 light-hours Voyager 1 was commanded to rotate several times (in the other direction then its spinning), to make detection in different directions.

It was determined that in 2012 Voyager 1 entered interstellar space, that is, it entered the interstellar medium between the stars. One of the reasons this was recognized was a significant increase in galactic cosmic rays.

In 2013, CRS data led some to propose that Voyager 1 had entered a "transition zone" as it leaves the heliosphere. There were some changes in the amounts and type of detections that triggered deeper analysis. The results from the magnetometer muddied the waters of interpretation.

First, I don't think any of us on the CRS [Cosmic Ray Subsystem, an instrument on Voyager] team will ever forget watching on the computer monitors, even on an hourly basis, in one case, as some particle intensities dropped precipitously, and others increased simultaneously on several occasions in July and August 2012.

Other scientists proposed that this indicated a departure from the Solar System in the sense that it had left the Sun's heliosphere. The issue was the interpretation of the drop in cosmic rays, which happened at 123 AU from the Sun for Voyager 2 that year. The many revelations and restructured understandings as the Voyagers head out, as influenced by data from the CRS and other active instruments, were called by Nature publication as the "long goodbye".

The CRS on Voyager 2, helped identify that spacecraft's departure from the Sun's heliosphere in 2018.

== CRS location ==
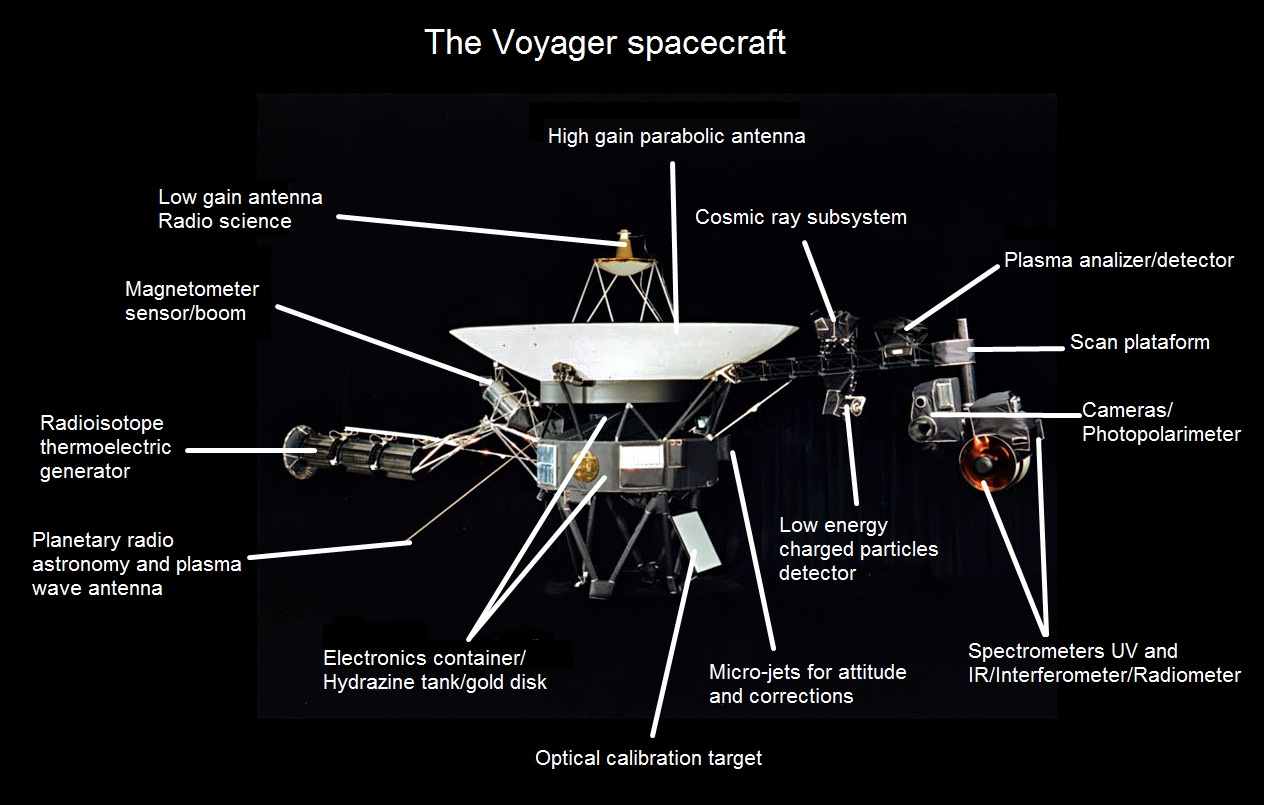
Labeled diagram, with CRS on the boom on the right, but to the left of the cameras. This does not show the magnetometer boom or the plasma experiment antennas.

== See also ==
- Cosmic-ray observatory
- New Horizons (see plasma and high-energy particle spectrometer suite)
- Local Interstellar Cloud
