= Particle Astrophysics Magnet Facility =

NASA project designed to investigate anti-matter

The Particle Astrophysics Magnet Facility (commonly known as ASTROMAG) is a NASA project that was designed to investigate anti-matter. It consisted of a series of experiments which would culminate in an experiment launched in 1995 to be externally attached to the Freedom Space Station.

== History ==
Experiments and postulation conducted during the 1970s and 1980s revealed a higher number of anti-protons than had been expected and to verify, and investigate further, a series of experiments were designed to culminate in an experiment launched for attachment to the Space Station.

=== ALICE and LEAP ===
In preparation for the building of the detectors and superconducting magnets to be used in the experiment some smaller ones were conducted in the upper atmosphere mounted underneath high altitude balloons: ALICE (A Large Isotropic Composition Experiment) and LEAP (Low Energy Antiproton Experiment) being the most notable.

ALICE was launched from Prince Albert Airport, Canada on 15 August 1987. It was designed to measure the isotopic composition of the rays entering Earth's atmosphere and so identify the types of particles which ASTROMAG would study in more detail. LEAP was launched twice also from Prince Albert, in July and August 1987 and measured the ratios between protons and anti-protons to try to establish verification in earlier experiments that reported higher than expected numbers of anti-protons.

== ASTROMAG ==
The original proposal was made in 1987 and announced in 1988 for implementation on the Freedom space station. The experiment was tested, accepted in 1989 and due for launch in 1995 but after various problems with other flights it was demoted from first to fifth place on the schedule.

The experiment, called the Particle Astrophysics Magnet Facility, was given the name ASTROMAG (NASA designated ASTRMAG) as it used a large superconducting magnet to deflect particles into its detectors. The magnet was made superconducting by being cooled to 2 kelvins. The hope was that the detectors would discover the oppositely charged anti-protons and so help physicists to use matter–antimatter reactions to develop new propulsions systems based on the resulting expulsion of energy. The experiment was to be mounted on the outside of the Space Station and measured 30 by 13 feet (9.1 by 4.0 m) and projections of costs were estimated at $30 million.

This was one of the first aimed at capturing material and particle data to further understand the origins and evolution of matter in the composition of the Universe. The experiment was to collect data from collisions of very high velocity particles by measuring their spectrum and attempting to find negatively charged helium or heavier elements. Eventually the delays in NASA missions and the shutdown of the Space Station led ASTROMAG to suffer a non-launch and the mission was shelved in 1991.

=== Free Flyer ===
The free flyer version was to be launched in 2005 into Earth orbit at a height of 310 miles (500 km). It aimed to detect high energy (>1 GeV per nucleon) cosmic ray nuclei, as well as electrons, to search for antimatter and dark matter candidates.

=== BESS ===
After the experiment was not launched researchers continued experiments using BESS and the methods employed by ALICE and LEAP in 1987. The latest attempt was a new Nuclear Compton Telescope (NCY) which was successfully test flown on 1 June 2005 from the Scientific Balloon Flight Facility, Fort Sumner, New Mexico. Its subsequent missions went well and some useful data was collected until it failed to launch in April 2010 at Alice Springs, Australia, when the balloon broke its tether to the crane in high winds.

== Alpha Magnetic Spectrometer ==
The experiment was superseded by the Alpha Magnetic Spectrometer which was approved by Congress. An earlier smaller test version called the AMS-01 was flown in 1998 on the shuttle Discovery during a flight to the Mir Russian space station. AMS-02 was delivered to the International Space Station in 2011.
