= Solar Anomalous and Magnetospheric Particle Explorer =

NASA satellite of the Explorer program

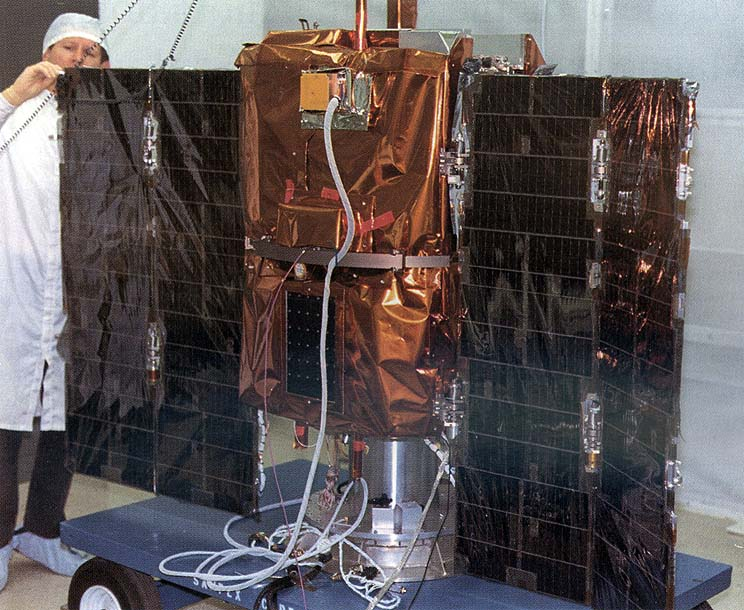
- SAMPEX satellite
- Names: Explorer 68; SAMPEX; SMEX-1
- Mission type: Magnetospheric research
- Operator: NASA / GSFC
- COSPAR ID: 1992-038A
- SATCAT no.: 22012
- Website: lasp.colorado.edu/sampex/
- Mission duration: 3 years (planned); 11 years, 11 months and 27 days (science mission)

Spacecraft properties
- Spacecraft: Explorer LXVIII
- Spacecraft type: Solar Anomalous and Magnetospheric Particle Explorer
- Bus: SAMPEX
- Manufacturer: Goddard Space Flight Center
- Launch mass: 158 kg (348 lb)
- Payload mass: 45.2 kg (100 lb)
- Dimensions: 1.5 × 0.9 m (4 ft 11 in × 2 ft 11 in)
- Power: 102 watts

Start of mission
- Launch date: 3 July 1992, 14:19 UTC
- Rocket: Scout G-1 (S-215C)
- Launch site: Vandenberg, SLC-5
- Contractor: Vought
- Entered service: 3 July 1992

End of mission
- Deactivated: 30 June 2004
- Last contact: 13 November 2012
- Decay date: 13 November 2012

Orbital parameters
- Reference system: Geocentric orbit
- Regime: Polar orbit
- Perigee altitude: 520 km (320 mi)
- Apogee altitude: 670 km (420 mi)
- Inclination: 82 deg
- Period: 96.70 minutes

Instruments
- Heavy Ion Large Telescope (HILT); Low-energy Ion Composition Analyzer (LICA); Mass Spectrometer Telescope (MAST); Proton/Electron Telescope (PET)
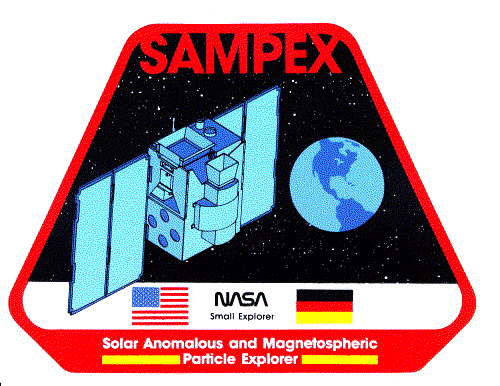
- SAMPEX (Explorer 68) mission patch Small Explorer program (SAMPEX) Explorer program

The Solar Anomalous and Magnetospheric Particle Explorer (SAMPEX or Explorer 68) was a NASA solar and magnetospheric observatory and was the first spacecraft in the Small Explorer program. It was launched into low Earth orbit on 3 July 1992 from Vandenberg Air Force Base (Western Test Range) aboard a Scout G-1 launch vehicle. SAMPEX was an international collaboration between NASA and the Max Planck Institute for Extraterrestrial Physics of Germany (which provided the Heavy Ion Large Telescope). The Solar Anomalous and Magnetospheric Particle Explorer (SAMPEX) is the first of a series of spacecraft that was launched under the Small Explorer (SMEX) program for low-cost spacecraft.

== Mission ==
The main objectives of SAMPEX experiments were to obtain data for several continuous years on the anomalous components of cosmic rays, on solar energetic particle emission from the Sun, and on the precipitating magnetospheric relativistic electrons. The orbit of SAMPEX has an altitude of 520 × 670 km (320 × 420 mi) and an 82 deg inclination. The spacecraft uses an onboard 3-axis stabilized solar-pointed/momentum bias system with the pitch axis pointed toward the Sun. Solar panels provide power for operations, including 16.7 watts for science instruments. An on-board Data processing unit (DPU) preprocesses the science and other data and stores them in a Recorder/Processor/Packetizer (RPP) unit of about 65 Mb, before transmitting in the S-band at a rate of 1.5 Mbit/s over Wallops Flight Facility (WFF) (or a back-up) station. The command memory can store at least a thousand commands. The science instruments generally point toward local zenith, especially over the terrestrial poles, for optimal sampling of galactic and solar cosmic ray flux. Energetic magnetospheric particle precipitation is monitored at lower geomagnetic latitudes.

== Spacecraft ==
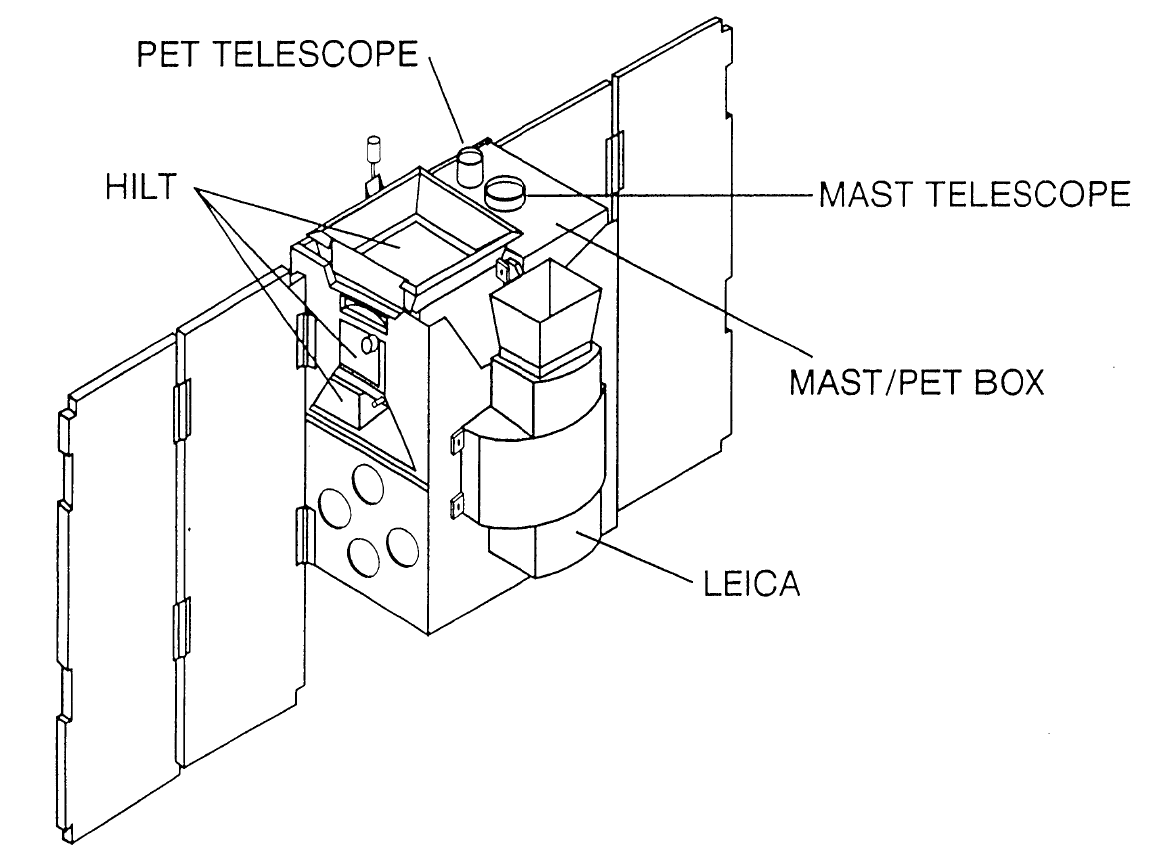
The spacecraft scheme

It carries four science instruments: (1) low-energy ion composition analyzer (LICA); (2) heavy ion large telescope (HILT); (3) mass spectrometer telescope (MAST); and (4) proton-electron telescope (PET). Estimated useful lifetime of the spacecraft was about three years; however, the data stream continued to 30 June 2004. In 1997, NASA Goddard transferred operation of SAMPEX to the Flight Dynamics and Control Laboratory (FDCL) housed within the Aerospace Engineering Department of the University of Maryland, College Park.

== Instruments ==
The spacecraft carried four instruments designed to measure the anomalous components of cosmic rays, emissions from solar energetic particles, and electron counts in Earth's magnetosphere. Built for a three-year mission, its science mission was ended on 30 June 2004. Mission control for SAMPEX was handled by the Goddard Space Flight Center until October 1997, after which it was turned over to the Bowie State University Satellite Operations Control Center (BSOCC). BSOCC, with funding assistance from The Aerospace Corporation, continued to operate the spacecraft after its science mission ended, using the spacecraft as an educational tool for its students while continuing to release science data to the public.

== Experiments ==
=== Heavy Ion Large Telescope (HILT) ===
The HILT experiment was designed to measure the charge, energy, and mass of cosmic rays in the energy range of about 8.0-310 MeV/nucleon. Specifically, the energy ranges were: Helium (He): 3.9 - 90 MeV/nucleon; Carbon (C): 7.2 - 160 MeV/nucleon; Oxygen (O): 8.3-310 MeV/nucleon; Neon (Ne): 9.1-250 MeV/nucleon; and, Iron (Fe): 11-90 MeV/nucleon. The instrument consisted of (a) an array of position-sensitive proportional counters at the entrance, followed by (b) an ionization chamber, (c) another array of position-sensitive proportional counters just before, (d) a coplanar, 10-element, solid state array of detectors. The detectors were backed by (e) a large caesium iodide (CsI) scintillation counter which was viewed by four light-sensitive diodes. The geometric factor was as large as 35 cm2-sr. The two position-sensitive counters enabled computation of the exact length of the trajectory along the ionization chamber. Items (a), (b), and (c) were filled with flowing isobutane gas at a pressure of 75 Torr. The 8.5 kg (19 lb) of liquid isobutane was sufficient for a three-year operation. The instrument was basically a dE/dx versus E system; dE/dx was provided by (a), (b), and (c), and E was provided by (d) and (e). The telemetered signals from all the sensors enabled accurate determination of isotopic mass, charge and energy. However, isotopic resolution was poor at the high-energy end of each band, especially for the heavier elements. Species-dependent fluxes were, however, readily computed even at the high energy ends.

=== Low-energy Ion Composition Analyzer (LICA) ===
The LICA experiment was designed to measure 0.5-5 MeV/nucleon solar and magnetospheric ions (He through Ni) arriving from the zenith in twelve energy bands. The mass of an ion was determined with simultaneous measurements of its time of flight (ToF) across a path length of approximately 50 cm (20 in) and its residual kinetic energy in one of four 4 × 9 cm (1.6 × 3.5 in) silicon (Si) solid-state detectors. Ions passing through the 0.75 micrometre nickel entrance foils emitted secondary electrons which a chevron microchannel plate assembly amplified to form a signal to begin timing. A double entrance foil prevented single pinholes from allowing sunlight to enter the telescope and provided immunity to solar and geocoronal ultraviolet. Another foil and microchannel plate assembly in front of the solid-state detectors gave the signal to stop timing. Wedge-and-strip anodes on the front sides of the timing anodes determined where the ion passed through the foils and, therefore, its flight path length. The velocity determined from the path length, the ToF, and the residual energy measured by the solid-state detectors were combined to yield the mass of the ion with a resolution of about 1%, adequate to provide complete isotope separation. Corrections for the energy loss in the entrance foils gave the ion's incident energy. The geometric factor of the sensor was 0.8 cm2-sr and the field of view was 17 deg x 21 deg. On-board processing determined whether ions triggering LICA were protons, He nuclei, or more massive ions. Protons were counted in a rate and not further analyzed. Heavier nuclei were treated as low (He) or high (more massive than He) priority for transmission to the ground. The instrument data processing unit ensured that a sample of both priority events was telemetered, but that low-priority events did not crowd out the rarer heavy species. Processed flux rates versus energy of H (hydrogen), He, O, Si group, and Fe groups were picked out every 15 seconds for transmission. Appropriate magnetic field models enabled specification of the atomic charge state by means of rigidity cut-off calculations. In addition, the proton cut-off versus energy during an orbit helped charge identification of the other species. On-board calibrations of the sensor were done by command about once per week. Data was stored in on-board memory of 26.5 MB, which was then dumped twice daily over ground stations.

=== Mass Spectrometer Telescope (MAST) ===
MAST was an 11-layer array of detectors, each of area >20 cm^{2} (3.1 sq in), stacked one below the other. The first four of these, M1, M2, M3, and M4, were surface-barrier, one-dimensional, position-sensitive detectors, each having 92 coplanar, parallel electrode strips with 0.5 mm (0.020 in) pitch. The combination of these four layers enabled determination of the X-Y coordinates at two positions, and hence the exact trajectories of penetrating nuclei. Following these were two more surface-barrier detectors, D1 and D2. Further downstream were lithium-drifted solid-state detectors, D3 through D7. The areas and thicknesses of the detectors were as follows: M1-M4: 20 cm^{2} (3.1 sq in), 115 micrometre; D1: 20 cm^{2} (3.1 sq in), 175 micrometre; D2: 20 cm^{2} (3.1 sq in), 500 micrometre; D3 through D7 had area of 30 cm^{2} (4.7 sq in), with thicknesses, respectively, of 1.8 mm (0.071 in), 3.0 mm (0.12 in), 6.0 mm (0.24 in) (compound stack of 2 3.0 mm (0.12 in) detectors), 9.0 mm (0.35 in) (compound stack of 3 3.0 mm (0.12 in) detectors), and 3.0 mm (0.12 in). The signal from the last-penetrated detector measured the residual energy E', and the upstream detectors provided dE/dx with abundant redundancy. The trajectory system, together with preflight calibrations at the Bevalac particle accelerator, enabled considerably more precision in isotopic mass determination, i.e. 0.2 amu than would otherwise have been possible for the energy range of 10 MeV/nucleon to several hundred MeV/nucleon, and charge ranges of 3 <= Z <= 28. The on-board DPU enabled down-linking of data from Z > 3 events on a priority basis.

=== Proton-Electron Telescope (PET) ===
PET consisted of an array of eight, lithium-drifted solid state detectors, together covering the energy range of 1-30 MeV for electrons, 18-85 MeV/nucleon for H and He, and 54-195 MeV/nucleon for the heavier elements. The geometric factors were about 1.0 cm**2-sr. H and He could be tracked into several hundred MeV/nucleon range but with a reduced geometric factor of 0.3. The top-most detectors, P1 (convex) and P2 (concave) were each 2 mm (0.079 in) thick, and had area of 8.1 cm^{2} (1.26 sq in). Downstream were the remaining, flat detectors P3 through P8, with the following dimensions. P3: 9.2 cm^{2} (1.43 sq in), 15 mm (0.59 in) (compound stack of 5 3.0 mm (0.12 in) detectors); and P4-P8: 4.5 cm^{2} (0.70 sq in), 3.0 mm (0.12 in). The instrument could be operated in a low gain (high-Z) mode or, ordinarily, in low-Z mode for observation of protons, electrons, and helium. Pulse height from the last-penetrated detector enabled determination of total E, and the upstream detectors provided dE/dx with enough redundancy to enable accurate determination of particle type. The counting rate of P1 was recorded with a resolution of 0.1 seconds, enabling observation of rapid time variations in the flux of precipitating electrons above energies of 0.4 MeV.

== Collaborators ==
SAMPEX collaborators included:

- The Aerospace Corporation
  - Dr. J. Bernard Blake, M. Looper, K. L. Lorentzen, D. Mabry, J. Mazur, R. Selesnick
- California Institute of Technology
  - A. Cummings, R. Leske, Dr. Richard A. Mewaldt, Prof. Edward C. Stone
- Laboratory for Atmospheric and Space Physics, University of Colorado Boulder
  - Dr. Daniel N. Baker, S. G. Kanekal, Xinlin Li
- Max Planck Institute, Garching
  - Dr. Dieter K. Hovestadt, Dr. Berndt Klecker, Dr. Manfred Scholer
- NASA Goddard Space Flight Center
  - Dr. Tycho T. Von Rosenvinge, Dr. Daniel N. Baker
- NASA Langley Research Center
  - Dr. Linwood B. Callis, Jr., J. Lambeth
- University of Maryland, College Park
  - Dr. Douglas C. Hamilton, Dr. Glenn M. Mason
- Washington University in St. Louis
  - J. Cummings

== Results ==
SAMPEX studies the energy composition and charge states of particles from supernova explosions in the distant reaches of the galaxy, from the heart of solar flares, and from nearby interstellar space. It also monitors closely the magnetospheric particle populations which plunge occasionally into the middle atmosphere of the Earth, thereby ionizing neutral gases and altering atmospheric chemistry. A key part of SAMPEX is to use the magnetic field of the Earth as an essential component of the measurement strategy. The Earth's field is used as a giant magnetic spectrometer to separate different energies and charge states of particles as SAMPEX executes its near polar orbit.

=== Scientific highlights ===
Retrospective mission summaries describe SAMPEX as a "pacesetting" small mission with major science returns over nearly two solar cycles. Selected highlights include:

- Determination that anomalous cosmic-ray nitrogen, oxygen, and neon are singly charged at low energies, supporting an interstellar neutral origin followed by ionization and acceleration in the heliosphere.
- Long-term observations of trapped anomalous cosmic rays in Earth's inner magnetosphere, enabling studies of source and loss mechanisms over the solar cycle.
- High-time-resolution measurements of relativistic electron precipitation (including "microbursts") and evidence for coupling between magnetospheric particle precipitation and changes in middle-atmosphere chemistry.

== Atmospheric entry ==
Built for a three-year primary mission, SAMPEX returned validated science data through 30 June 2004. The spacecraft continued to operate in a post-science phase and reentered Earth's atmosphere on 13 November 2012.

== See also ==
- Explorer program
