= Explorer 50 =

NASA satellite of the Explorer program

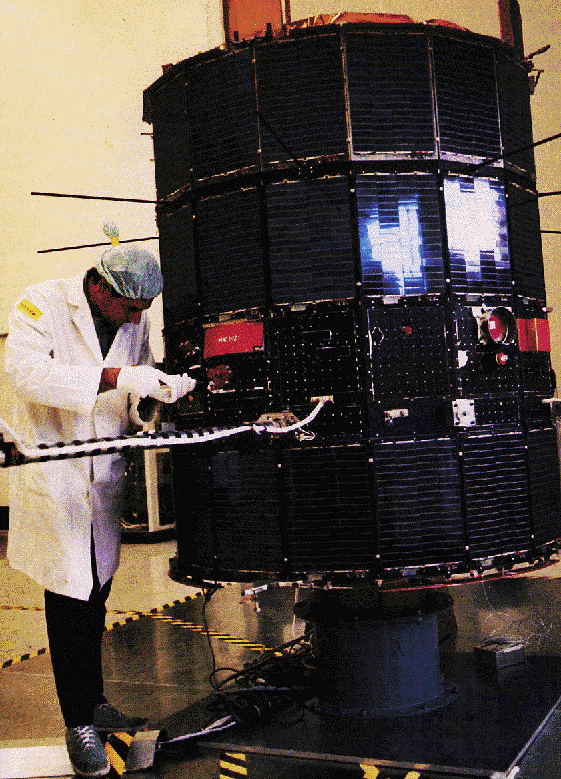
- Explorer 50 (IMP-8) satellite
- Names: IMP-J; IMP-8; Interplanetary Monitoring Platform-8
- Mission type: Space physics
- Operator: NASA
- COSPAR ID: 1973-078A
- SATCAT no.: 06893
- Mission duration: 34 years (achieved); 52 years, 9 months, 19 days (in orbit)

Spacecraft properties
- Spacecraft: Explorer L
- Spacecraft type: Interplanetary Monitoring Platform
- Bus: IMP
- Manufacturer: Goddard Space Flight Center
- Launch mass: 371 kg (818 lb)
- Dimensions: Polyhedron of 16 faces: 157.4 cm (62.0 in) height 135.6 cm (53.4 in) diameter
- Power: 150 watts

Start of mission
- Launch date: 26 October 1973, 02:26:03 UTC
- Rocket: Thor-Delta 1604 (Thor 582 / Delta 097)
- Launch site: Cape Canaveral, LC-17B
- Contractor: Douglas Aircraft Company
- Entered service: 26 October 1973

End of mission
- Deactivated: October 2001
- Last contact: 7 October 2006

Orbital parameters
- Reference system: Geocentric orbit
- Regime: High Earth orbit
- Perigee altitude: 22.11 RE
- Apogee altitude: 45.26 RE
- Inclination: 28.64°
- Period: 11.99 days

Instruments
- Charged Particle Measurements Experiment (CPME); Cosmic Ray Nuclear Composition; Electrons, Hydrogen and Helium Isotopes; Electrostatic Fields; Electrostatic Waves and Radio Noise; Energetic Electrons and Protons; Magnetic Field Experiment; Measurement of Low-Energy Protons and Electrons; Solar and Cosmic-Ray Particles; Solar Plasma Electrostatic Analyzer; Solar Plasma Faraday Cup

Explorer 50, also known as IMP-J or IMP-8, was a NASA satellite launched to study the magnetosphere. It was the eighth and last in a series of the Interplanetary Monitoring Platform.

== Spacecraft ==
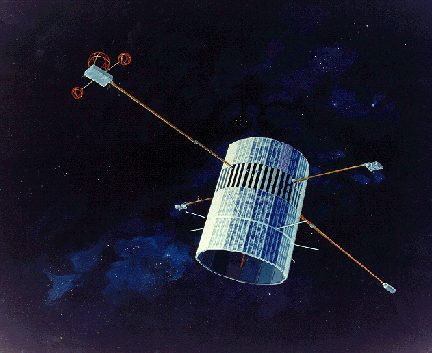
Explorer 50 also called IMP 8 (Interplanetary Monitoring Platform 8) in Orbit

Explorer 50 was a drum-shaped spacecraft, 135.6 cm (53.4 in) across and 157.4 cm (62.0 in) height, with propulsion Star-17A, instrumented for interplanetary medium and magnetotail studies of cosmic rays, energetic solar particles, plasma, and electric and magnetic fields. Its initial orbit was more elliptical than intended, with apogee and perigee distances of about 45.26 Earth radii and 22.11 Earth radii. Its orbital eccentricity decreased after launch. Its orbital inclination varied between 0 deg and about 55° with a periodicity of several years. The spacecraft spin axis was normal to the ecliptic plane, and the spin rate was 23 rpm. The data telemetry rate was 1600 bit/s. The spacecraft was in the solar wind for 7 to 8 days of every 11.99 days orbit. Telemetry coverage was 90% in the early years, but only 60-70% through most of the 1980s and early 1990s. Coverage returned to the 90% range in the mid to late 1990s.

== Launch ==
Explorer 50 was launched on 23 October 1973 at 02:26:03 UTC, by a Thor-Delta 1604 launch vehicle from Cape Canaveral (CCAFS), Florida. The spacecraft functioned nominally until 7 October 2006. The satellite orbited the Earth once every 12 days, at an inclination of 28.67°. Its perigee was 25 Earth radii and apogee was 45 Earth radii.

== Experiments ==
=== Charged Particle Measurements Experiment (CPME) ===
Three solid-state detectors in an anticoincidence plastic scintillator observed electrons between 0.2 and 2.5 MeV; protons between 0.3 and 500 MeV; alpha particles between 2.0 and 200 MeV; heavy particles with Z values ranging from 2 to 5 with energies greater than 8 MeV; heavy particles with Z values ranging between 6 and 8 with energies greater than 32 MeV; and integral protons and alphas of energies greater than 50 MeV/nucleon, all with dynamic ranges of 1 to 1E+6 particles per (cm^{2}-second-sr). Five thin-window Geiger–Müller tubes observed electrons of energy greater than 15 keV, protons of energy greater than 250 keV, and X-rays with wavelengths between 2 and 10 A, all with a dynamic range of 10 to 1E+8 per (cm^{2}-second-sr). Particles and X-rays, primarily of solar origin, were studied, but the dynamic range and resolution of the instrument also permitted observation of cosmic rays and magnetotail particles.

=== Cosmic Ray Nuclear Composition ===
This experiment used two telescopes to measure the composition and energy spectra of solar (and galactic) particles above about 0.5 MeV/nucleon. The main telescope consisted of five collinear elements (three solid state, one Caesium iodide (CsI), and one sapphire Cherenkov) surrounded by a plastic anticoincidence shield. The telescope had a 60°, full-angle acceptance cone with its axis approximately normal to the spacecraft spin axis, permitting eight-sectored information on particle arrival direction. Four elements of the main telescope were pulse-height analyzed, and low- and high-gain modes could be selected by command to permit resolution of the elements Hydrogen (H) through Nickel (Ni) or of electrons and the isotopes of Hydrogen (H) and Helium (He) and light nuclei. A selection-priority scheme was included to permit sampling of less abundant particle species under normal and solar-flare conditions. The low-energy telescope was essentially a two-element shielded solid-state detector with a 70° full-angle acceptance cone. The first element was pulse-height analyzed, and data were recorded by sectors.

=== Electrons, Hydrogen and Helium Isotopes ===
This experiment was designed to measure the differential energy spectra of the isotopes of hydrogen through oxygen from 2 to 40-MeV/nucleon, and of electrons from 0.2 to 5 MeV. The instrument consisted of a stack of 11 fully depleted silicon solid-state detectors surrounded by a plastic scintillator anticoincidence cup. The outer two solid-state detectors were annular, permitting measurements in both narrow-geometry (typical geometrical factor was 0.2 cm^{2} sr) and wide-geometry (typical geometric factor was 1.5 cm^{2} sr) coincidence modes. Anisotropy data (45° angular and 20 seconds temporal resolution) were obtained.

=== Electrostatic Fields ===
The instrument was designed to measure ambient electric fields in the solar wind and the Earth's magnetosheath up to 1 kHz in frequency. The sensor consisted of a pair of 70 m (230 ft) wire antennas (140 m (460 ft), tip-to-tip), which were held rigid by centrifugal force due to satellite spin (about 24 rpm). The wires were insulated from the plasma, except for their short outer sections, to remove the active probe area from the spacecraft sheath. The antenna served as a double floating probe, and measurements were obtained every 1/4 spacecraft revolution (about 0.75 second). Ultra low frequency (ULF) and Very low frequency (VLF) measurements were obtained using seven 60% bandwidth filters with center frequencies logarithmically spaced from 1 Hz to 1000 Hz. These frequency channels had an intrinsic sensitivity of 1.0E-5 V/m, and a peak range of 1.0E-2 V/m. However, the effective low-frequency filter threshold was determined by interference due to harmonics of the spacecraft spinning within an asymmetric sheath. The other major limitation was also due to sheath effect. Whenever the electron plasma density was less than about 10 particles per cubic centimetre, the sheath overlapped the active antenna portions and precluded meaningful measurements of ambient conditions.

=== Electrostatic Waves and Radio Noise ===
A wide-band receiver was used to observe high-resolution frequency-time spectra, and a six-channel narrow-band receiver with a variable center frequency was used to observe wave characteristics. The receivers operated from three antenna systems. The first system contained a pair of long dipole antennas (one, extendable to about 124 m (407 ft), normal to the spacecraft spin axis and the other antenna, extendable to about 6.1 m (20 ft), along the spin axis). The second system contained a boom-mounted triad of orthogonal loop antennas. The third system consisted of a boom-mounted 0.51 m (1 ft 8 in) spin-axis dipole. The magnetic and electric field intensities and frequency spectra, polarization, and direction of arrival of naturally occurring radio noise in the magnetosphere were observed. Phenomena studied were the time-space distribution, origin, propagation, dispersion, and other characteristics of radio noise occurring across and on either side of the magnetospheric boundary region. The frequency range for electric fields was 0.3 Hz to 200 kHz, and for magnetic fields it was 20 Hz to 200 kHz.

=== Energetic Electrons and Protons ===
The purposes of this investigation were: (1) to study the propagation characteristics of solar cosmic rays through the interplanetary medium over the energy ranges indicated below, (2) to study electron and proton fluxes throughout the geomagnetic tail and near the flanks of the magnetosphere and (3) to study the entry of solar cosmic rays into the magnetosphere. The instrumentation consisted of a three-element telescope employing fully depleted surface-barrier solid-state detectors and a magnet to deflect electrons. Two side-mounted detectors were used to measure the deflected electrons. Two additional detectors in separate mounts were used to measure charged particles above 15 keV (F), Z greater than or equal to 2 above 0.6 MeV (G1) and above 1.0 MeV (G2), and Z greater than or equal to 3 above 2.0 MeV (G3). The telescope measured protons in three ranges between 2.1 and 25 MeV (14, 15, 16 channels); Z greater than or equal to 1 in three ranges between 0.05 and 2.1 MeV (11, 12, 13 channels); alpha particles between 8.4 and 35.0 MeV in two ranges (111, 112 channels); Z greater than or equal to 2 between 2.2 and 8.4 MeV (110 channel); and a background channel (19 channel). Deflected electrons were measured in two ranges between 30 and 200 keV (17, 18 channels).

=== Magnetic Field Experiment ===
This experiment consisted of a boom-mounted triaxial fluxgate magnetometer designed to study the interplanetary and geomagnetic tail magnetic fields. Each sensor had three dynamic ranges of ± 12, ± 36, and ± 108 nT. With the aid of a bit compaction scheme (delta modulation), 25 vector measurements were made and telemetered per second. The experiment operated normally from launch until mid-1975. On 11 July 1975, because of a range indicator problem, the experiment operation was frozen into the 36 nT range. The digitization accuracy in this range is about ± 0.3 nT. On 23 March 1978, the sensor flipper failed. After that time, alternative methods of Z-axis sensor zero-level determination were required. The magnetometer failed 10 June 2000.

=== Measurement of Low-Energy Protons and Electrons ===
This experiment was designed to measure the energy spectra of low-energy electrons and protons in the geocentric range of 30 to 40 Earth radii to give further data on geomagnetic storms, aurora, tail and neutral sheet, and other magnetospheric phenomena. The detector was a dual-channel, curved-plate electrostatic analyzer (LEPEDEA - low energy proton and electron differential energy analyzer) with 16 energy intervals between 5 eV and 50 keV. It had an angular field of view of 9° by 25°. The detector could be operated in one of two modes: (1) one providing good angular resolution (16 directions for each particle energy band) once each 272 seconds, and (2) the other providing good temporal resolution in which the entire energy range in four directions was measured every 68 seconds.

=== Solar and Cosmic-Ray Particles ===
The Goddard Space Flight Center cosmic-ray experiment was designed to measure energy spectra, composition, and angular distributions of solar and galactic electrons, protons, and heavier nuclei up to Z=30. Three distinct detector systems were used. The first system consisted of a pair of solid-state telescopes that measured integral fluxes of electrons above 150, 350 and 700 keV and of protons above 0.05, 0.15, 0.50, 0.70, 1.0, 1.2, 2.0, 2.5, 5.0, 15, and 25 MeV. Except for the 0.05 MeV proton mode, all counting modes had unique species identification. The second detector system was a solid-state dE/dx versus E telescope that looked perpendicular to the spin axis. This telescope measured Z=1 to 16 nuclei with energies between 4 and 20 MeV/nucleon. Counts of particles in the 0.5 to 4 MeV/nucleon range, with no charge resolution, were obtained as counts in the dE/dx sensor but not in the E sensor. The third detector system was a three-element telescope whose axis made an angle of 39° with respect to the spin axis. The middle element was a CsI scintillator, while the other two elements were solid-state sensors. The instrument responded to electrons between 2 and 12 MeV and to Z=1 to 30 nuclei in the energy range 20 to 500 MeV/nucleon. For particles below 80 MeV, this instrument acted as a dE/dx versus E detector. Above 80 MeV, it acted as a bidirectional triple dE/dx versus E detector. Flux directionality information was obtained by dividing certain portions of the data from each detector into eight angular sectors.

=== Solar Plasma Electrostatic Analyzer ===
A hemispherical electrostatic analyzer measured the directional intensity of positive ions and electrons in the solar wind, magnetosheath, and magnetotail. Ions as heavy as oxygen were resolved when the solar wind temperature was low. Energy analysis was accomplished by charging the plates to known voltage levels and allowing them to discharge with known RC time constants. In the solar wind, positive ions from 200-eV to 5 keV (15% spacing, 3% resolution) and electrons from 5 eV to 1 keV (30% spacing, 15% resolution) were studied. In the magnetosheath, positive ions from 200 eV to 5 keV (15% spacing, 3% resolution) and from 200 eV to 20 keV (30% spacing, 15% resolution) and electrons from 5 eV to 1 keV (30% spacing, 15% resolution) were studied. In the magnetotail, positive ions from 200 eV to 20 keV (30% spacing, 15% resolution) and electrons from 5 eV to 1 keV (30% spacing, 15% resolution) and from 100 eV to 20 keV (15% resolution) were studied. No data were obtained from this experiment past October 2001.

=== Solar Plasma Faraday Cup ===
A modulated split-collector Faraday cup, perpendicular to the spacecraft spin axis, was used to study the directional intensity of positive ions and electrons in the solar wind, transition region, and magnetotail. Electrons were studied in eight logarithmically equispaced energy channels between 17 eV and 7 keV. Positive ions were studied in eight channels between 50 eV and 7 keV. A spectrum was obtained every eight spacecraft revolutions. Angular information was obtained in either 15 equally spaced intervals during a 360° revolution of the satellite or in 15 angular segments centered more closely about the spacecraft-sun line.

=== Solid-State Detectors ===
This experiment was designed to determine the composition and energy spectra of low-energy particles observed during solar flares and 27-d recurrent events. The detectors used included: (1) an electrostatic analyzer (to select particles of the desired energy per charge) combined with an array of windowless solid-state detectors (to measure the energy loss) and surrounded by an anticoincidence shield and (2) a thin-window proportional counter, solid-state particle telescope. The experiment measured particle energies from 0.1 to 10 MeV per charge in 12 bands and uniquely identified positrons and electrons as well as nuclei with charges of Z from 1 to 8 (no charge resolution for Z greater than 8). Two 1000-channel pulse-height analyzers, one for each detector, were included in the experiment payload.

== Extended mission ==
The objectives of the extended Explorer 50 (IMP-8) operations were to provide solar wind parameters as input for magnetospheric studies and as a 1-AU baseline for deep space studies, and to continue solar cycle variation studies with a single set of well-calibrated and understood instruments.

== End of mission ==
In October 2001, Explorer 50 (IMP-8) was terminated as an independent mission. Telemetry acquisition resumed after about three months at Canberra, Australia, only (30-50% coverage), as an adjunct to the Voyager and Ulysses missions. The last useful science data from Explorer 50 (IMP-8) was acquired on 7 October 2006.

== See also ==
- Explorer 43
- Explorer 47
- Explorer program
- List of heliophysics missions
