= Rochus Eugen Vogt =

German-American physicist

Rochus Vogt
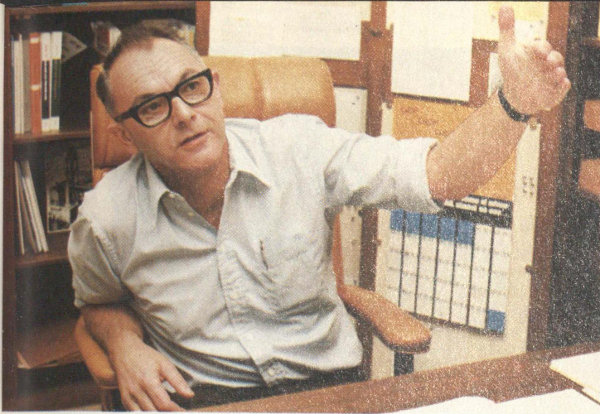
- Vogt c. 1980
- Born: Rochus Eugen Vogt; 21 December 1929 (age 96); Neckarelz, Germany
- Education: University of Chicago (PhD)
- Children: 2 daughters
- Scientific career
- Fields: cosmic ray physics
- Thesis: Primary cosmic-ray and solar protons (1961)
- Doctoral advisor: Peter Meyer
- Doctoral students: Alan C. Cummings; Neil Gehrels

Rochus Eugen (Robbie) Vogt (born December 21, 1929) is a German-American physicist, famous as the director and principal investigator of the LIGO project from 1987 to 1994.

== Biography ==
Vogt studied from 1950 to 1952 at the University of Karlsruhe and from 1952 to 1953 at Heidelberg University. In 1953, he came to the United States. He graduated from the University of Chicago in physics with a master's degree in 1957 and a PhD in 1961. His doctoral dissertation Primary cosmic-ray and solar protons was supervised by Peter Meyer. At Caltech, Vogt was an assistant professor from 1962 to 1965, an associate professor from 1965 to 1970, a full professor from 1970 to 1982, and R. Stanton Avery Distinguished Service from 1982 to 2002, when he retired as professor emeritus. He was chair of Caltech's Division of Physics, Mathematics and Astronomy from 1978 to 1983. He was the acting director of the Owens Valley Radio Observatory from 1980–1981. He was a mentor to Michael Turner, Neil Gehrels, and Anneila Sargent. Gehrels was one of Vogt's doctoral students.

Vogt was a principal investigator of the Cosmic Ray Subsystem experiment of the Voyager mission.

Vogt received the NASA Exceptional Scientific Achievement Medal for his work as a principal investigator on the Voyager mission, and was chief scientist at Caltech’s Jet Propulsion Laboratory in 1977–78. He led the construction of Caltech’s Owens Valley Radio Observatory’s mm-wave interferometer, had a lead role in bringing about the Keck Observatory on Mauna Kea, Hawaii, and served as vice chair of the board of directors of the California Association for Research in Astronomy. From 1987 to 1994 he served as the director and principal investigator of the Caltech-MIT Laser Interferometer Gravitational-Wave Observatory project, becoming a co-recipient of the 2016 Special Breakthrough Prize in Fundamental Physics.

In 1992, he was elected a Fellow of the American Association for the Advancement of Science.

Vogt married in 1958 and is the father of two daughters.

== Selected publications ==
=== Articles ===
- Israel, Martin H.; Vogt, Rochus E. (1969). "Characteristics of the diurnally varying electron flux near the polar cap". Journal of Geophysical Research. 74 (19): 4714–4720. Bibcode:1969JGR....74.4714I. doi:10.1029/JA074i019p04714. hdl:2060/19690007265.
- Vogt, Rochus E.; Siscoe, George L. (1975). "Particles and fields in the outer solar system". Icarus. 24 (3): 333–347. Bibcode:1975Icar...24..333V. doi:10.1016/0019-1035(75)90129-3.
- Vogt, R. E.; Cook, W. R.; Cummings, A. C.; Garrard, T. L.; Gehrels, N.; Stone, E. C.; Trainor, J. H.; Schardt, A. W.; Conlon, T.; Lal, N.; McDonald, F. B. (1979). "Voyager 1: Energetic Ions and Electrons in the Jovian Magnetosphere". Science. 204 (4396): 1003–1007. Bibcode:1979Sci...204.1003V. doi:10.1126/science.204.4396.1003. PMID 17800440. S2CID 10361345.
- Vogt, R. E.; Cummings, A. C.; Garrard, T. L.; Gehrels, N.; Stone, E. C.; Trainor, J. H.; Schardt, A. W.; Conlon, T. F.; McDonald, F. B. (1979). "Voyager 2: Energetic Ions and Electrons in the Jovian Magnetosphere". Science. 206 (4421): 984–987. Bibcode:1979Sci...206..984V. doi:10.1126/science.206.4421.984. PMID 17733919. S2CID 26814583.
- Webber, W. R.; Stone, E. C.; Vogt, R. E. (1979). "Conference paper: The elemental composition of quiet time low energy cosmic rays measured on the Voyager spacecraft". In: Proceedings of the 16th International Cosmic Ray Conference. Vol. 12. University of Tokyo Press. pp. 357–362.
- Mewaldt, R. A.; Spalding, J.; Stone, E.; Vogt, R. (1980). "High-Resolution Measurements of Galactic Cosmic-Ray Neon, Magnesium and Silicon Isotopes". Astrophysical Journal. 235: L95–L99. Bibcode:1980ApJ...235L..95M. doi:10.1086/183166.
- Vogt, R. E.; Chenette, D. L.; Cummings, A. C.; Garrard, T. L.; Stone, E. C.; Schardt, A. W.; Trainor, J. H.; Lal, N.; McDonald, F. B. (1981). "Energetic Charged Particles in Saturn's Magnetosphere: Voyager 1 Results". Science. 212 (4491): 231–234. Bibcode:1981Sci...212..231V. doi:10.1126/science.212.4491.231. PMID 17783835.
- Vogt, R. E.; Chenette, D. L.; Cummings, A. C.; Garrard, T. L.; Stone, E. C.; Schardt, A. W.; Trainor, J. H.; Lal, N.; McDonald, F. B. (1982). "Energetic Charged Particles in Saturn's Magnetosphere: Voyager 2 Results". Science. 215 (4532): 577–582. Bibcode:1982Sci...215..577V. doi:10.1126/science.215.4532.577. PMID 17771281. S2CID 1380624.
- Abramovici, A.; Althouse, W. E.; Drever, R. W. P.; Gürsel, Y.; Kawamura, S.; Raab, F. J.; Shoemaker, D.; Sievers, L.; Spero, R. E.; Thorne, K. S.; Vogt, R. E.; Weiss, R.; Whitcomb, S. E.; Zucker, M. E. (1992). "LIGO: The Laser Interferometer Gravitational-Wave Observatory" (PDF). Science. 256 (5055): 325–333. Bibcode:1992Sci...256..325A. doi:10.1126/science.256.5055.325. hdl:11858/00-001M-0000-0013-4663-0. PMID 17743108. S2CID 53709232.
- Feynman, Richard P.; Gottlieb, Michael A.; Leighton, Ralph (29 January 2013). "Interview with Rochs Vogt (interviewers: Ralph Leighton and Michael Gottlieb)". Feynman's Tips on Physics: Reflections, Advice, Insights, Practice. Basic Books. pp. 29–34. ISBN 978-0-465-02797-2.

=== Books ===
- Leighton, Robert B.; Vogt, Rochus E. (1969). Exercises in Introductory Physics. Addison-Wesley Publishing Company. ISBN 978-0-201-04215-3. (exercises for use with volume 1 of The Feynman Lectures on Physics)
