= Loop I Bubble =

Supershell

Superbubble
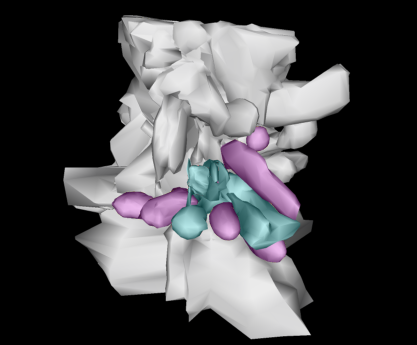
- 3D representation of the Local Bubble (grey) with neighbouring Molecular Clouds (magenta) and a section of the Loop I Bubble (cyan).

Observation data: J2000.0 epoch
- Right ascension: 14^{h} 59^{m}
- Declination: −38.3°
- Distance: 200 pc
- Designations: Loop I, Loop I Bubble, Loop I Superbubble, Loop I Supershell

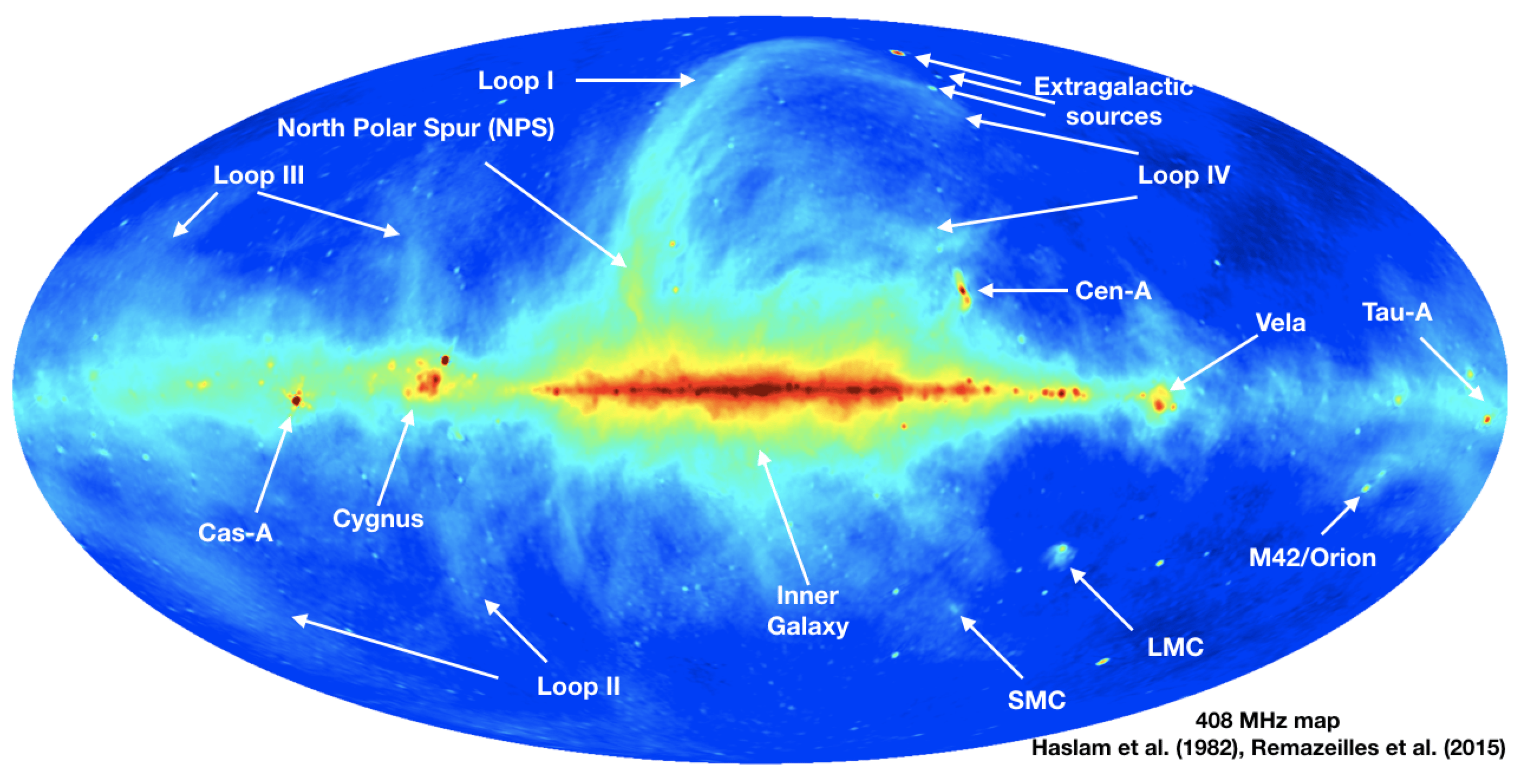
The location of Loop I in a 408 MHz map of the Milky Way

The Loop I Bubble is a supershell cavity in the interstellar medium (ISM) of the Orion Arm of the Milky Way. From our Sun's point of view, it is situated towards the Galactic Center of the Milky Way galaxy.

The Loop I Bubble is located roughly 100 parsecs, or 330 light years, from the Sun. The Loop I Bubble was created by supernovae and stellar winds in the Scorpius–Centaurus association, some 500 light years from the Sun. The Loop I Bubble contains the star Antares (also known as Alpha Scorpii). Several tunnels connect the cavities of the Local Bubble with the Loop I Bubble, called the "Lupus Tunnel".

== See also ==
- Local Bubble
- Orion Arm
- Superbubble
