= Local Bubble =

Milky Way superbubble

Superbubble
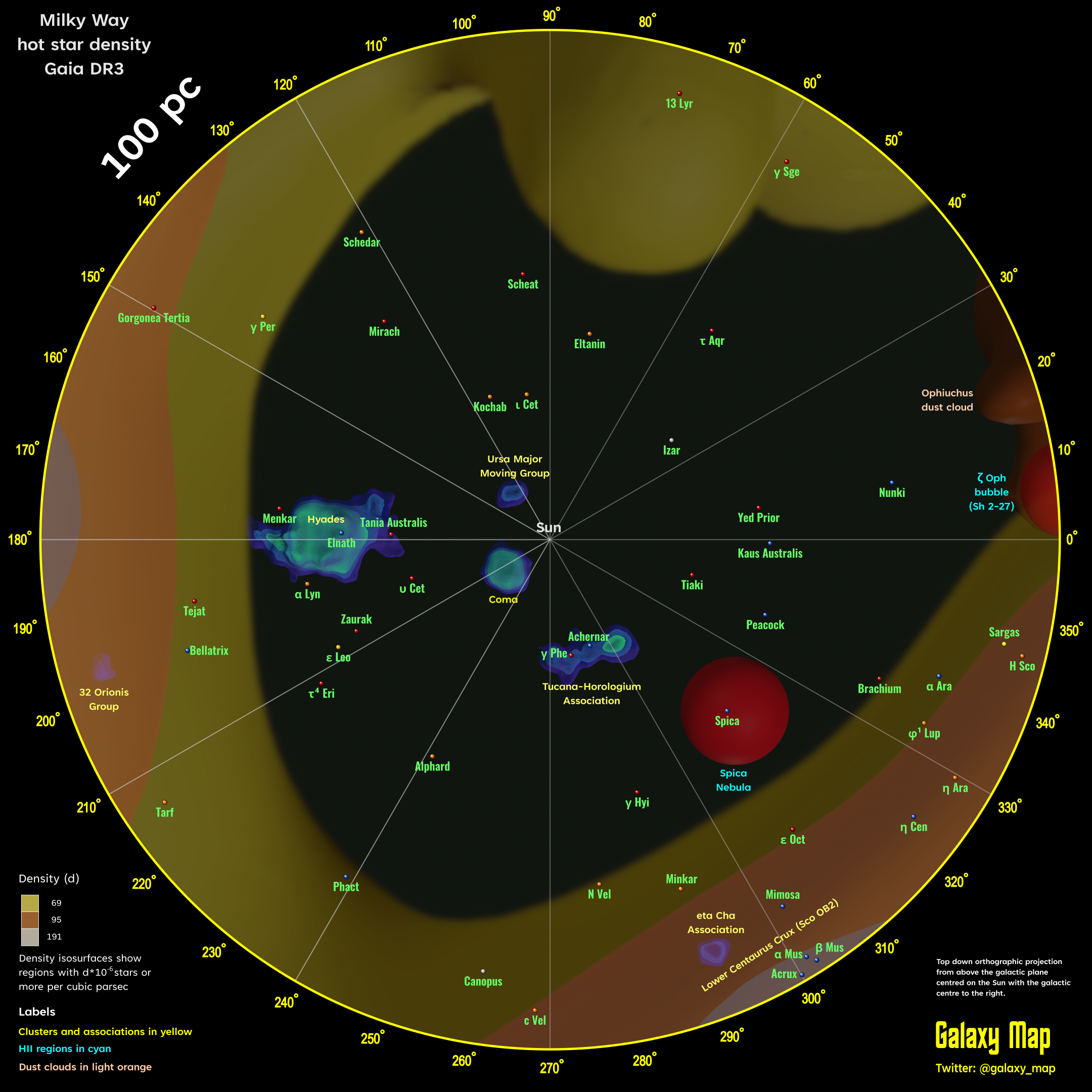
- Map of open star clusters and bright stars in the Local Bubble, viewed from top down

Observation data
- Distance: 0 ly (0 pc)

Physical characteristics
- Radius: 500 ly
- Designations: Local Hot Bubble, LHB, Local Bubble, Local Interstellar Bubble

The Local Bubble, or Local Cavity, is a relative cavity in the interstellar medium (ISM) of the Orion Arm in the Milky Way. It contains the nearest stars and brown dwarfs and, among others, the Local Interstellar Cloud (which contains the Solar System), the neighboring G-Cloud, the Ursa Major moving group (List of nearby stellar associations and moving groups stellar moving group), and the Hyades (the nearest open cluster). It is estimated to be at least 1000 light years in size, and is defined by its neutral-hydrogen density of about 0.05 atoms/cm^{3}, or approximately one tenth of the average for the ISM in the Milky Way (0.5 atoms/cm^{3}), and one sixth that of the Local Interstellar Cloud (0.3 atoms/cm^{3}).

The exceptionally sparse gas of the Local Bubble is the result of supernovae that exploded within the past ten to twenty million years. Geminga, a pulsar in the constellation Gemini, was once thought to be the remnant of a single supernova that created the Local Bubble, but now multiple supernovae in subgroup B1 of the Pleiades moving group are thought to have been responsible, becoming a remnant supershell. Other research suggests that the subgroups Lower Centaurus–Crux (LCC) and Upper Centaurus–Lupus (UCL), of the Scorpius–Centaurus association created both the Local Bubble and the Loop I Bubble, with LCC being responsible for the Local Bubble and UCL being responsible for the Loop I Bubble. It was found that 14 to 20 supernovae originated from LCC and UCL, which could have formed these bubbles.

== Description ==
The Solar System has been traveling through the region currently occupied by the Local Bubble for the last five to ten million years. Its current location lies in the Local Interstellar Cloud (LIC), a minor region of denser material within the Bubble. The LIC formed where the Local Bubble and the Loop I Bubble met. The gas within the LIC has a density of approximately 0.3 atoms per cubic centimeter.

The Local Bubble is not spherical, but appears to be narrower in the galactic plane, becoming somewhat egg-shaped or elliptical, and may widen above and below the galactic plane, becoming shaped like an hourglass. It abuts other bubbles of less dense interstellar medium (ISM), including, in particular, the Loop I Bubble. The Loop I Bubble was cleared, heated, and maintained by supernovae and stellar winds in the Scorpius–Centaurus association, some 500 light years from the Sun. The Loop I Bubble contains the star Antares (also known as α Sco, or Alpha Scorpii), as shown on the diagram above right. Several tunnels connect the cavities of the Local Bubble with the Loop I Bubble, called the "Lupus Tunnel". Other bubbles adjacent to the Local Bubble are the Loop II Bubble and the Loop III Bubble. In 2019, researchers found interstellar iron in Antarctica which they relate to the Local Interstellar Cloud, which might be related to the formation of the Local Bubble.

== Observation ==
By measuring the absorption of more distant starlight by nearby interstellar gas, the initial mapping of the local interstellar cloud was completed in 1992. The morphology of the local bubble was mapped in 2003 by R. Lallement and associates. They did so by measuring the distribution of neutral nitrogen atoms in the ISM. They found that the local bubble is linked to other nearby cavaties via interstellar tunnels.

Launched in February 2003 and active until April 2008, a small space observatory called Cosmic Hot Interstellar Plasma Spectrometer (CHIPSat) examined the hot gas within the Local Bubble. The Local Bubble was also the region of interest for the Extreme Ultraviolet Explorer mission (1992–2001), which examined hot EUV sources within the bubble. Sources beyond the edge of the bubble were identified but attenuated by the denser interstellar medium. In 2019, the first 3D map of the Local Bubble was reported using observations of diffuse interstellar bands. In 2020, the shape of the dusty envelope surrounding the Local Bubble was retrieved and modeled from 3D maps of the dust density obtained from stellar extinction data.

== Impact on star formation ==
As the bubble expands it sweeps interstellar gas and dust which collapse to form new stars on its surface but not inside. The Sun entered the bubble around five million years ago.

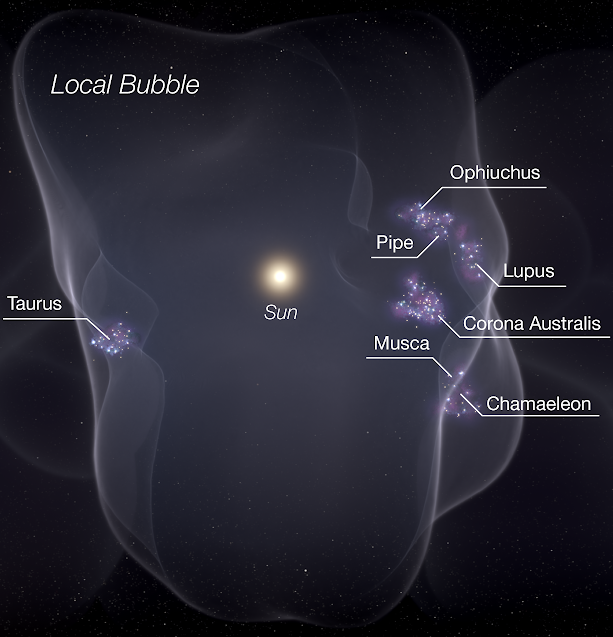
Local Bubble and its molecular clouds

In January 2022, a paper in the journal Nature found that observations and modeling had determined that the action of the expanding surface of the bubble had collected gas and debris and was responsible for the formation of all young, nearby stars.

These new stars are typically in molecular clouds like the Taurus molecular cloud and the open star cluster Pleiades.

== Connection to radioactive isotopes on Earth ==
Several radioactive isotopes on Earth have been connected to supernovae occurring relatively nearby to the solar system. The most common source is found in deep sea ferromanganese crusts, which are constantly growing, aggregating iron, manganese, and other elements. Samples are divided into layers which are dated, for example, with beryllium-10. Some of these layers have higher concentrations of radioactive isotopes. The isotope most commonly associated with supernovae on Earth is iron-60 from deep-sea sediments, Antarctic snow, and lunar soil. Other isotopes are manganese-53 and plutonium-244 from deep-sea materials. Supernova-originated aluminium-26, which was expected from cosmic ray studies, was not confirmed. Iron-60 and manganese-53 have a peak 1.7–3.2 million years ago, and iron-60 has a second peak 6.5–8.7 million years ago. The older peak likely originated when the solar system moved through the Orion–Eridanus Superbubble and the younger peak was generated when the solar system entered the Local Bubble 4.5 million years ago. One of the supernovae creating the younger peak might have created the pulsar PSR B1706-16 and turned Zeta Ophiuchi into a runaway star. Both originated from UCL and were released by a supernova 1.78 ± 0.21 million years ago. Another explanation for the older peak is that it was produced by one supernova in the Tucana–Horologium association 7–9 million years ago.

== See also ==
- Gould Belt
- List of nearest stars and brown dwarfs
- List of nearby stellar associations and moving groups
- List of Milky Way streams
- Orion–Eridanus Superbubble
- Orion Arm
- Superbubble
