= G-Cloud =

Interstellar cloud located next to the Local Interstellar Cloud

Interstellar cloud
- The G-Cloud complex and neighboring Local Interstellar Cloud

Observation data
- Designations: G Cloud

The Galactic cloud, G cloud, G-Cloud or G-Cloud complex, is an interstellar cloud located next to the Local Interstellar Cloud, within the Local Bubble. It is unknown whether the Solar System is embedded in the Local Interstellar Cloud or in the region where the two clouds are interacting, although the Solar System is currently moving towards the G-Cloud. The G-Cloud contains the stars Alpha Centauri (a triple star system that includes Proxima Centauri), Altair, and possibly others.

It is unknown whether the Sun is embedded in the Local Interstellar Cloud, or is in the region where the Local Interstellar Cloud is interacting with the neighboring G-Cloud. Like the Local Interstellar Cloud and others, the G-Cloud is part of the Very Local Interstellar Medium which begins where the heliosphere and interplanetary medium end.

== Formation ==
The G-Cloud was formed along with the Local Bubble approximately 20 million years ago due to supernova activities. The Local Interstellar Cloud was also formed at the same time.

== Structure ==
The Solar System is located within a structure called the Local Bubble, a low-density region of the galactic interstellar medium. Within this region is the G-Cloud, an area of slightly higher hydrogen density. It is estimated that the Solar System entered the Local Interstellar Cloud within the past 10,000 years. It is uncertain whether the Sun is still inside of the Local Interstellar Cloud or has already entered a transition zone between the LIC and the G cloud. The cloud covers 20% of the sky.

Estimates for the n(H I) particle density in the direction of Alpha Centauri were made in 2011 by Crawford as 0.1 cm^{−3} and in 2014 by Gry as 0.098 cm^{−3}. The temperature of the G-Cloud is 5500 ± 400 K. It has a comparatively lower metal depletion.

The Local Interstellar Cloud and G-Cloud are moving towards each other. They form a mixed interstellar cloud medium (MICM) where they meet.

== See also ==
- Gould Belt
- List of nearest stars and brown dwarfs
- List of nearby stellar associations and moving groups
- Orion Arm
- Perseus Arm
- Voyager program
