= Local Interstellar Cloud =

Interstellar cloud in the Milky Way Galaxy

Interstellar cloud
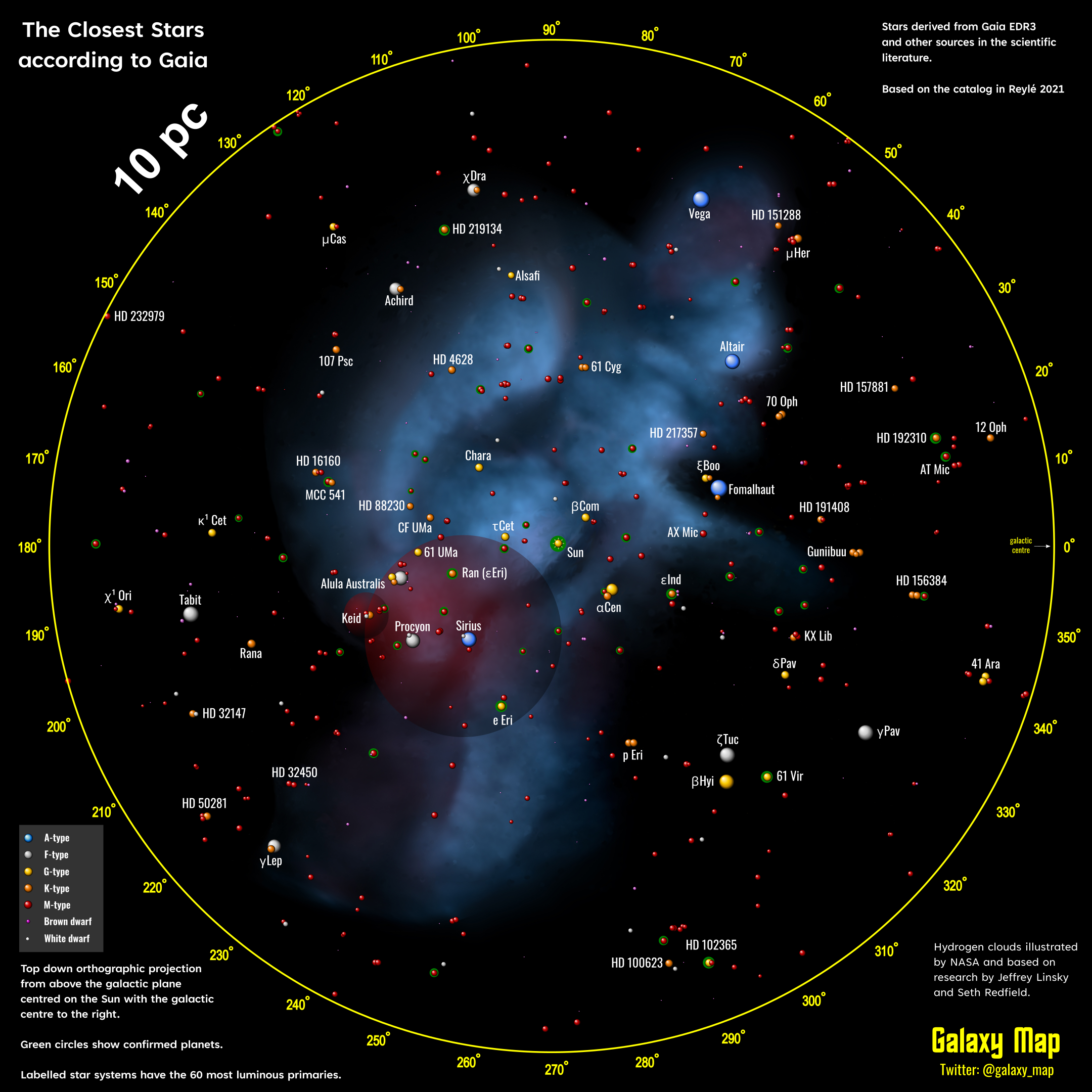
- Diagram of surrounding stars and artist's conception of the Local Interstellar Cloud

Observation data
- Constellation: None, Solar System is inside the nebula

Physical characteristics
- Dimensions: 30 ly (9.2 pc)
- Designations: Local Cloud, Local Fluff, LIC

Map showing the Sun located near the edge of the Local Interstellar Cloud and Alpha Centauri about 4 light-years away in the neighboring G-Cloud complex

The Local Interstellar Cloud (LIC), also known as the Local Fluff, is an interstellar cloud roughly 30 light-years (9.2 pc) across, through which the Solar System is moving. This feature overlaps with a region around the Sun referred to as the solar neighborhood. It is unknown whether the Sun is embedded in the Local Interstellar Cloud, or is in the region where the Local Interstellar Cloud is interacting with the neighboring G-Cloud. Like the G-Cloud and others, the LIC is part of the Very Local Interstellar Medium which begins where the heliosphere and interplanetary medium end, the furthest that probes have traveled.

== Structure ==
The Solar System is located within a structure called the Local Bubble, a low-density region of the galactic interstellar medium. Within this region is the Local Interstellar Cloud (LIC), an area of slightly higher hydrogen density. It is estimated that the Solar System entered the LIC within the past 10,000 years. It is uncertain whether the Sun is still inside of the LIC or has already entered a transition zone between the LIC and the G cloud. A recent analysis estimates the Sun will completely exit the LIC in no more than 1,900 years.

The cloud has a temperature of about 7,000 K (7,000 °C; 12,000 °F), about the same temperature as the surface of the Sun. However, its specific heat capacity is very low because it is not very dense, with 0.3 atoms per cubic centimetre (5/cu in). This is less dense than the average for the interstellar medium in the Milky Way (0.5/cm^{3} or 8/cu in), though six times denser than the gas in the hot, low-density Local Bubble (0.05/cm^{3} or 0.8/cu in) which surrounds the local cloud. In comparison, Earth's atmosphere at the edge of space (i.e. 100 km above sea level) has around 1.2×10^{13} molecules per cubic centimeter, dropping to around 50 million (5.0×10^{7}) at 450 km (280 mi).

The cloud is flowing outwards from the Scorpius–Centaurus association, a stellar association that is a star-forming region, roughly perpendicular to the Sun's own direction.

In 2019, researchers found interstellar iron-60 (^{60}Fe) in Antarctica, which they relate to the Local Interstellar Cloud.

== Interaction with solar magnetic field ==
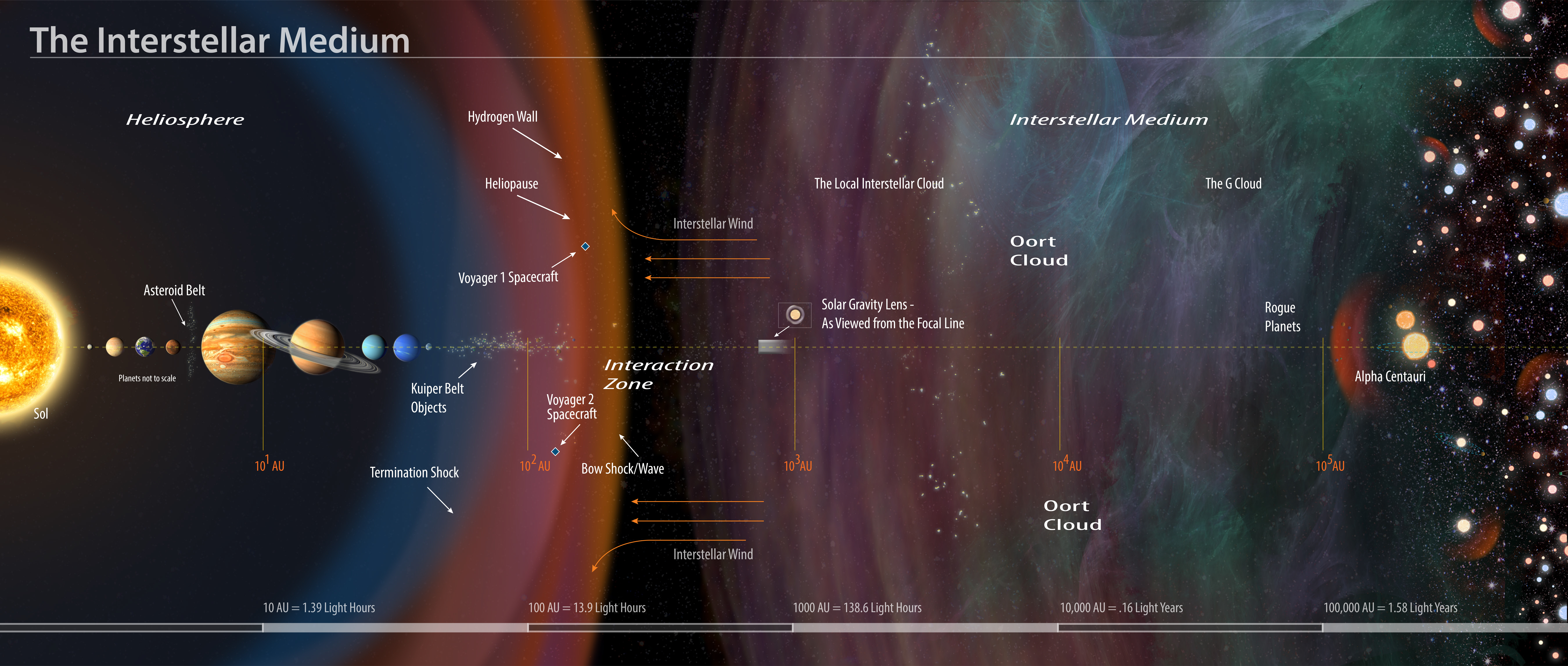
The Solar System within the interstellar medium, with the different regions and their distances on a logarithmic scale (object sizes not to scale)

In 2009, Voyager 2 data suggested that the magnetic strength of the local interstellar medium was much stronger than expected (370 to 550 picoteslas (pT), against previous estimates of 180 to 250 pT). The fact that the Local Interstellar Cloud is strongly magnetized could explain its continued existence despite the pressures exerted upon it by the winds that blew out the Local Bubble.

The Local Interstellar Cloud's potential effects on Earth are greatly diminished by the solar wind and the Sun's magnetic field. This interaction with the heliosphere is under study by the Interstellar Boundary Explorer (IBEX), a NASA satellite mapping the boundary between the Solar System and interstellar space.

== See also ==
- Gould Belt
- List of nearest stars and brown dwarfs
- List of nearby stellar associations and moving groups
- Orion Arm
- Perseus Arm
- Voyager program – probes left heliosphere in the 2010s
