= Sun =

Star at the centre of the Solar System

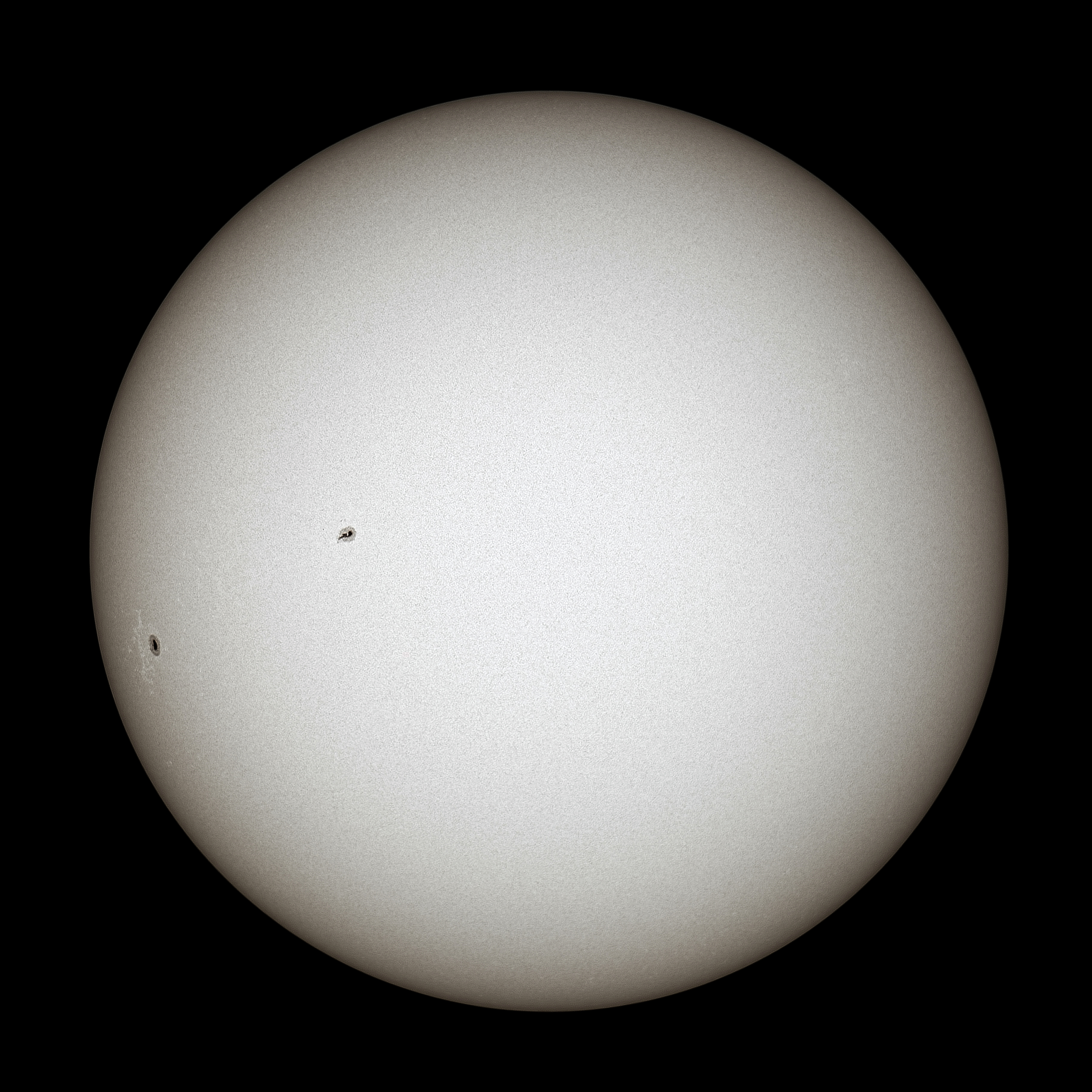
- The Sun as viewed through a clear solar filter
- Names: Sun, Sol, Sól, Helios
- Adjectives: Solar
- Symbol: Circle with dot in the middle

Observation data
- Mean distance from Earth: 1 au 149,600,000 km 8 min 19 s, light speed
- Visual brightness: −26.74 (V)
- Absolute magnitude: 4.83
- Spectral classification: G2V
- Metallicity: Z = 0.0165±0.0010
- Angular size: 0.527°–0.545°

Orbital characteristics
- Mean distance from Milky Way core: 24,000 to 28,000 light-years
- Galactic period: 225–250 million years
- Velocity: 251 km/s orbit about Galactic Center; 20 km/s to stellar neighbourhood; 370 km/s to cosmic microwave background
- Obliquity: 7.25° (ecliptic); 67.23° (galactic plane)
- Right ascension North pole: 286.13° (286° 7′ 48″)
- Declination of North pole: +63.87° (63° 52′ 12"N)
- Sidereal rotation period: 25.05 days (equator); 34.4 days (poles)
- Equatorial rotation velocity: 1.997 km/s

Physical characteristics
- Equatorial radius: 695,500 km 109 × Earth radius
- Flattening: 0.00005
- Surface area: 6.09×10^{12} km^{2} 12,000 × Earth surface area
- Volume: 1.412×10^{18} km^{3}; 1,300,000 × Earth volume
- Mass: (1.988475±0.000092)×10^{30} kg; 332,950 × Earth mass
- Average density: 1.408 g/cm^{3} 0.255 × Earth density
- Age: 4.6 billion years
- Equatorial surface gravity: 274 m/s^{2} 27.9 g_{0}
- Moment of inertia factor: ~ 0.059
- Surface escape velocity: 617.7 km/s 55 × Earth escape velocity
- Temperature: 15,700,000 K (centre); 5,777 K (photosphere); 5,000,000 K (corona)
- Luminosity: 3.828×10^{26} W; 3.75×10^{28} lm; 98 lm/W efficacy; 2.99×10^{27} cd; 6.17×10^{9} lm/m²
- Colour (B-V): 0.656±0.005
- Mean radiance: 2.009×10^{7} W·m^{−2}·sr^{−1}
- Photosphere composition by mass: 73.46% hydrogen; 24.85% helium; 0.77% oxygen; 0.29% carbon; 0.16% iron; 0.12% neon; 0.09% nitrogen; 0.07% silicon; 0.05% magnesium; 0.04% sulfur

The Sun is the star located at the centre of the Solar System. It is a massive sphere of hot plasma, heated to incandescence by nuclear fusion reactions in its core, radiating the energy from its surface mainly as visible light and infrared radiation, with 10% at ultraviolet energies. It is the main source of energy for life on Earth. The Sun has been an object of veneration in many cultures and a central subject of astronomical research since antiquity.

The Sun orbits the Galactic Center at a distance of 24,000 to 28,000 light-years. Its mean distance from Earth is about 1.496×10^{8} kilometres or about 8 light-minutes. The distance between the Sun and the Earth was used to define a unit of length called the astronomical unit (au), now defined to be 149.5978707×10^{6} kilometres. It is the largest and most massive object in the Solar System; its diameter is about 1,391,400 km (864,600 mi), around 109 times that of Earth. The Sun's mass is around 330,000 times that of Earth, making up about 99.86% of the total mass of the Solar System. The mass of the Sun's surface layer, its photosphere, consists mostly of hydrogen (~73%) and helium (~25%), with much smaller quantities of heavier elements, including oxygen, carbon, neon, and iron.

The Sun formed approximately 4.6 billion (Note: All numbers in this article are short scale. One billion is 10^{9}, or 1,000,000,000.) years ago from the gravitational collapse of matter within a region of a large molecular cloud. Most of this matter gathered in the centre; the rest flattened into an orbiting disk that became the Solar System. The central mass became so hot and dense that it eventually initiated nuclear fusion in its core. It is now classified as a G-type main-sequence star (G2V). Every second, the Sun's core fuses about 600 billion kilograms (kg) of hydrogen into helium and converts four billion kilograms of matter into energy.

About four to seven billion years from now, when hydrogen fusion in the Sun's core diminishes to the point where the Sun is no longer in hydrostatic equilibrium, its core will undergo a marked increase in density and temperature which will cause its outer layers to expand, eventually transforming the Sun into a red giant. After the red giant phase, models suggest the Sun will shed its outer layers and become a dense type of cooling star (a white dwarf), and no longer produce energy by fusion, but will still glow and give off heat from its previous fusion for perhaps trillions of years. After that, it is theorised to become an extremely dense black dwarf, giving off negligible energy.

== Etymology ==
The English word sun developed from Old English sunne. Cognates appear in other Germanic languages, including West Frisian sinne, Dutch zon, Low German Sünn, Standard German Sonne, Bavarian Sunna, Old Norse sunna, and Gothic sunnō. All these words stem from Proto-Germanic *sunnōn. This is ultimately related to the word for sun in other branches of the Indo-European language family, though in most cases a nominative stem with an l is found, rather than the genitive stem in n, as for example in Latin sōl, ancient Greek ἥλιος (hēlios), Welsh haul and Czech slunce, as well as (with *l > r) Sanskrit स्वर् (svár) and Persian خور (xvar). Indeed, the l-stem survived in Proto-Germanic as well, as *sōwelan, which gave rise to Gothic sauil (alongside sunnō) and Old Norse prosaic sól (alongside poetic sunna), and through it the words for sun in the modern Scandinavian languages: Swedish and Danish sol, Icelandic sól, etc.

The principal adjectives for the Sun in English are sunny for sunlight and, in technical contexts, solar (/ˈsoʊlər/), from Latin sol. From the Greek helios comes the rare adjective heliac (/ˈhiːliæk/). In English, the Greek and Latin words occur in poetry as personifications of the Sun, Helios (/ˈhiːliəs/) and Sol (/ˈsɒl/), while in science fiction Sol may be used to distinguish the Sun from other stars. The term sol with a lowercase s is used by planetary astronomers for the duration of a solar day on another planet such as Mars.

The astronomical symbol for the Sun is a circle with a central dot: ☉. It is used for such units as M_{☉} (Solar mass), R_{☉} (Solar radius) and L_{☉} (Solar luminosity). The scientific study of the Sun is called heliology.

== General characteristics ==
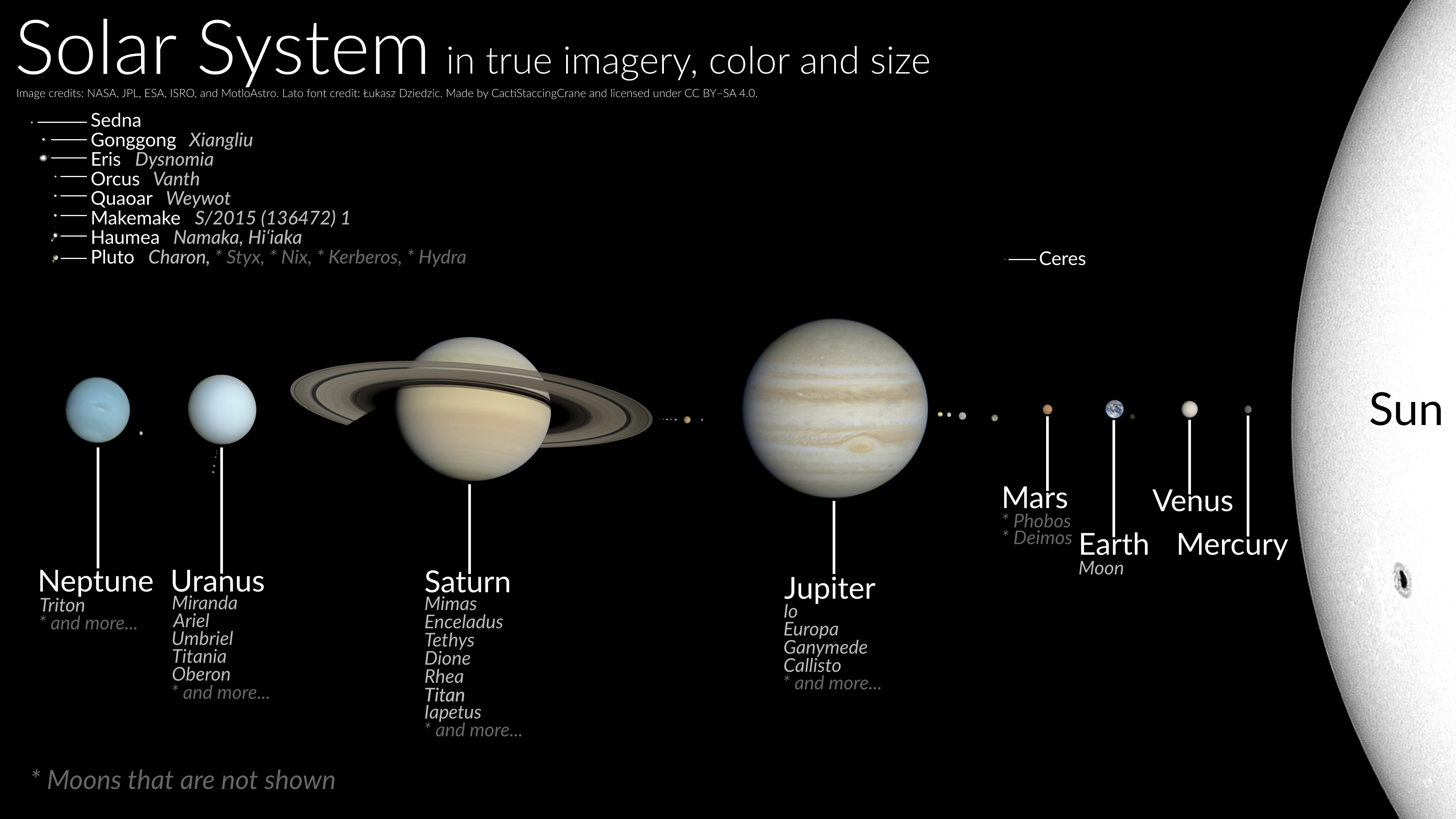
Size comparison of major celestial objects in the Solar System, including the Sun. Distances are not to scale.

The Sun is a G-type main-sequence star that makes up about 99.86% of the mass of the Solar System. The Sun is classed as a G2 star, meaning it is a G-type star, with 2 indicating its surface temperature is in the second range of the G class. It has an absolute magnitude of +4.83, estimated to be brighter than about 85% of the stars in the Milky Way, most of which are red dwarfs. It is more massive than 95% of the stars within 7 pc (23 ly). The Sun is a Population I, or heavy-element-rich, (Note: In astronomical sciences, the term heavy elements (or metals) refers to all chemical elements except hydrogen and helium.) star.

=== Shape ===
The Sun does not have a definite boundary, but its density decreases exponentially with increasing height above the photosphere. For the purpose of measurement, the Sun's radius is considered to be the distance from its centre to the edge of the photosphere, the apparent visible surface of the Sun. The roundness of the Sun is the relative difference between its radius at its equator, $R_\textrm{eq}$, and at its pole, $R_\textrm{pol}$, called the oblateness,

$$\Delta_\odot = (R_\textrm{eq} -R_\textrm{pol})/R_\textrm{pol}.$$

The value is difficult to measure. Atmospheric distortion means the measurement must be done on satellites; the value is very small meaning very precise technique is needed.

The oblateness was once proposed to be sufficient to explain the perihelion precession of Mercury but Einstein proposed that general relativity could explain the precession using a spherical Sun. When high precision measurements of the oblateness became available via the Solar Dynamics Observatory and the Picard satellite the measured value was even smaller than expected, 8.2×10^{−6}, or 8 parts per million. These measurements determined the Sun to be the natural object closest to a perfect sphere ever observed. The oblateness value remains constant independent of solar irradiation changes. The tidal effect of the planets is weak and does not significantly affect the shape of the Sun.

=== Rotation ===
The Sun rotates faster at its equator than at its poles. This differential rotation is caused by convective motion due to heat transport and the Coriolis force due to the Sun's rotation. In a frame of reference defined by the stars, the rotational period is approximately 25.6 days at the equator and 33.5 days at the poles. Viewed from Earth as it orbits the Sun, the apparent rotational period of the Sun at its equator is about 28 days. Viewed from a vantage point above its north pole, the Sun rotates counterclockwise around its axis of spin. (Note: Counterclockwise is also the direction of revolution around the Sun for objects in the Solar System and is the direction of axial spin for most objects.)

A survey of solar analogues suggests the early Sun was rotating up to ten times faster than it does today. This would have made the surface much more active, with greater X-ray and UV emission. Sunspots would have covered 5%–30% of the surface. The rotation rate was gradually slowed by magnetic braking, as the Sun's magnetic field interacted with the outflowing solar wind. A vestige of this rapid primordial rotation still survives at the Sun's core, which rotates at a rate of once per week; four times the mean surface rotation rate.

=== Composition ===
The Sun's photosphere consists mainly of the elements hydrogen and helium. At this time in the Sun's life, they account for 74.9% and 23.8%, respectively, of the mass of the Sun in the photosphere. All heavier elements, called metals in astronomy, account for less than 2% of the mass, with oxygen (roughly 1% of the Sun's mass), carbon (0.3%), neon (0.2%), and iron (0.2%) being the most abundant. The chemical composition of the photosphere is normally considered representative of the composition of the primordial Solar System. Typically, the solar heavy-element abundances described above are measured both by using spectroscopy of the Sun's photosphere and by measuring abundances in meteorites that have never been heated to melting temperatures. These meteorites are thought to retain the composition of the protostellar Sun and are thus not affected by settling of heavy elements within the Sun. The two methods generally agree well.

The Sun's original chemical composition was inherited from the interstellar medium out of which it formed. Originally it would have been about 71.1% hydrogen, 27.4% helium, and 1.5% heavier elements.

The interior composition of the Sun is not known. Estimates based on models of stellar nuclear reactions give different values than estimates based on observations of solar seismology.

Since the Sun formed, the main fusion process has involved fusing hydrogen into helium. Over the past 4.6 billion years, the amount of helium and its location within the Sun has gradually changed. The proportion of helium within the core has increased from about 24% to about 60% due to fusion, and some of the helium and heavy elements have settled from the photosphere toward the centre of the Sun because of gravity. The proportions of heavier elements are unchanged. Heat is transferred outward from the Sun's core by radiation rather than by convection (see Radiative zone below), so the fusion products are not lifted outward by heat; they remain in the core, and gradually an inner core of helium has begun to form that cannot be fused because presently the Sun's core is not hot or dense enough to fuse helium. In the current photosphere, the helium fraction is reduced, and the metallicity is only 84% of what it was in the protostellar phase (before nuclear fusion in the core started). In the future, helium will continue to accumulate in the core, and in about 5 billion years this gradual build-up will eventually cause the Sun to exit the main sequence and become a red giant.

== Structure ==
Illustration of the Sun's structure in false colour for contrast

=== Core ===
The core of the Sun extends from the centre to about 20–25% of the solar radius. It has a density of up to 150 g/cm^{3} (about 150 times the density of liquid water) and a temperature of close to 15.7 million kelvins (K). By contrast, the Sun's surface temperature is about 5800 K. Recent analysis of SOHO mission data favours the idea that the core is rotating faster than the radiative zone outside it. Through most of the Sun's life, energy has been produced by nuclear fusion in the core region through the proton–proton chain; this process converts hydrogen into helium. Currently, 0.8% of the energy generated in the Sun comes from another sequence of fusion reactions called the CNO cycle; the proportion coming from the CNO cycle is expected to increase as the Sun becomes older and more luminous.

The core is the only region of the Sun that produces an appreciable amount of thermal energy through fusion; 99% of the Sun's power is generated in the innermost 24% of its radius, and almost no fusion occurs beyond 30% of the radius. The rest of the Sun is heated by this energy as it is transferred outward through many successive layers, finally to the solar photosphere where it escapes into space through radiation (photons) or advection (massive particles).

Illustration of a proton-proton reaction chain, from hydrogen forming deuterium, helium-3, and regular helium-4

The proton–proton chain occurs around 9.2×10^{37} times each second in the core, converting about 3.7×10^{38} protons into alpha particles (helium nuclei) every second (out of a total of ~8.9×10^{56} free protons in the Sun), or about 6.2×10^{11} kg/s. However, each proton (on average) takes around 9 billion years to fuse with another using the PP chain. Fusing four free protons (hydrogen nuclei) into a single alpha particle (helium nucleus) releases around 0.7% of the fused mass as energy, so the Sun releases energy at the mass–energy conversion rate of 4.26 billion kg/s (which requires 600 billion kg of hydrogen), for 384.6 yottawatts (3.846×10^{26} W), or 9.192×10^{10} megatons of TNT per second. The large power output of the Sun is mainly due to the huge size and density of its core (compared to Earth and objects on Earth), with only a fairly small amount of power being generated per cubic metre. Theoretical models of the Sun's interior indicate a maximum power density, or energy production, of approximately 276.5 watts per cubic metre at the centre of the core, which, according to Karl Kruszelnicki, is about the same as the power density inside a compost pile.

The fusion rate in the core is in a stable equilibrium: a slightly higher rate of fusion would cause the core to heat up more and expand slightly against the weight of the outer layers, reducing the density and hence the fusion rate and correcting the perturbation; and a slightly lower rate would cause the core to cool and shrink slightly, increasing the density and increasing the fusion rate and again reverting it to its present rate.

=== Radiative zone ===
Illustration of different stars' internal structure based on mass. The Sun in the middle has an inner radiating zone and an outer convective zone.

The radiative zone is the thickest layer of the Sun. It starts above the core at about 0.25 solar radii and out to about 0.7 solar radii. The zone is so named because thermal radiation is the primary means of energy transfer: photons scatter from dense gas so often that they take a million years to cross this zone. The temperature drops from approximately 7 million to 2 million kelvins with increasing distance from the core. This temperature gradient is less than the value of the adiabatic lapse rate and hence cannot drive convection, which explains why the transfer of energy through this zone is by radiation instead of thermal convection. The density drops a hundredfold (from 20,000 kg/m^{3} to 200 kg/m^{3}) between 0.25 solar radii and 0.7 radii, the top of the radiative zone.

=== Tachocline ===
The radiative zone and the convective zone are separated by a transition layer, the tachocline. This is a region where the sharp regime change between the uniform rotation of the radiative zone and the differential rotation of the convection zone results in a large shear between the two—a condition where successive horizontal layers slide past one another. Presently, it is hypothesised that a magnetic dynamo, or solar dynamo, within this layer generates the Sun's magnetic field.

=== Convective zone ===
The Sun's convection zone extends from 0.7 solar radii (500,000 km) to near the surface. In this layer, the solar plasma is not dense or hot enough to transfer the heat energy of the interior outward via radiation. Instead, the density of the plasma is low enough to allow convective currents to develop and move the Sun's energy outward towards its surface. Material heated at the tachocline picks up heat and expands, thereby reducing its density and allowing it to rise. As a result, an orderly motion of the mass develops into thermal cells that carry most of the heat outward to the Sun's photosphere above. Once the material diffusively and radiatively cools just beneath the photospheric surface, its density increases, and it sinks to the base of the convection zone, where it again picks up heat from the top of the radiative zone and the convective cycle continues. At the photosphere, the temperature has dropped 350-fold to 5,700 K (9,800 °F) and the density to only 0.2 g/m^{3} (about 1/10,000 the density of air at sea level, and 1 millionth that of the inner layer of the convective zone).

The thermal columns of the convection zone form an imprint on the surface of the Sun giving it a granular appearance called the solar granulation at the smallest scale and supergranulation at larger scales. Turbulent convection in this outer part of the solar interior sustains "small-scale" dynamo action over the near-surface volume of the Sun. The Sun's thermal columns are Bénard cells and take the shape of roughly hexagonal prisms.

=== Atmosphere ===
The solar atmosphere is the region of the Sun that extends from the top of the convection zone to the inner boundary of the heliosphere. It is often divided into three primary layers: the photosphere, the chromosphere, and the corona. The chromosphere and corona are separated by a thin transition region that is frequently considered as an additional distinct layer. Some sources consider the heliosphere to be the outer or extended solar atmosphere.

==== Photosphere ====
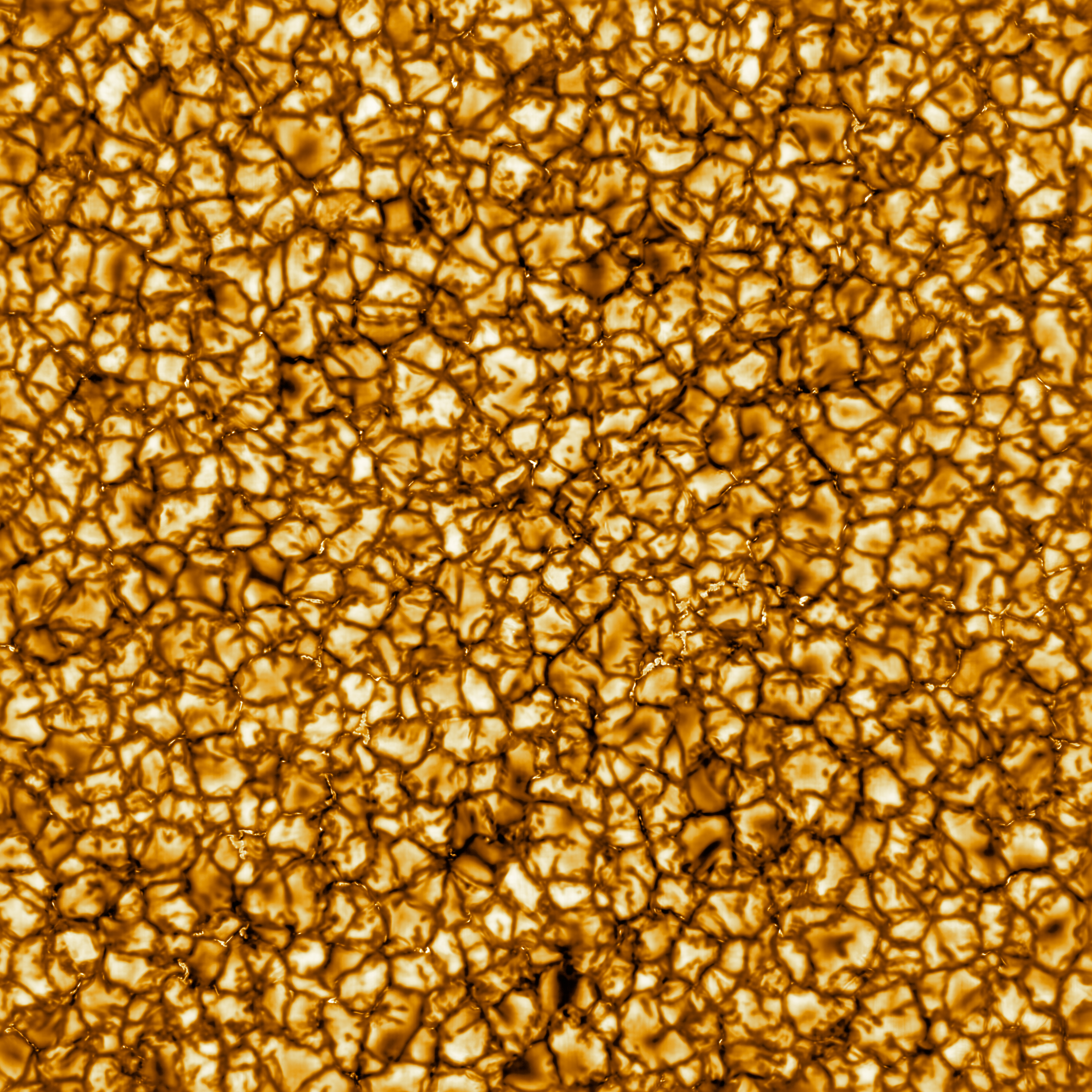
The photosphere is structured by convection cells referred to as granules.

The visible surface of the Sun, the photosphere, is the layer below which the Sun becomes opaque to visible light. Photons produced in this layer escape the Sun through the transparent solar atmosphere above it and become solar radiation, sunlight. The change in opacity is due to the decreasing amount of H^{−} ions, which absorb visible light easily. Conversely, the visible light perceived is produced as electrons react with hydrogen atoms to produce H^{−} ions.

The photosphere is tens to hundreds of kilometres thick, and is slightly less opaque than air on Earth. Because the upper part of the photosphere is cooler than the lower part, an image of the Sun appears brighter in the centre than on the edge or limb of the solar disk, in a phenomenon known as limb darkening. The spectrum of sunlight has approximately the spectrum of a black-body radiating at 5,777 K (9,939 °F), interspersed with atomic absorption lines from the tenuous layers above the photosphere. The photosphere has a particle density of ~10^{23} m^{−3} (about 0.37% of the particle number per volume of Earth's atmosphere at sea level). The photosphere is not fully ionised—the extent of ionisation is about 3%, leaving most of the hydrogen in atomic form.

The coolest layer of the Sun is a temperature minimum region extending to about 500 km above the photosphere, and has a temperature of about 4,100 K. This part of the Sun is cool enough to allow for the existence of simple molecules such as carbon monoxide and water.

==== Chromosphere ====
Above the temperature minimum layer is a layer about 2,000 km thick, dominated by a spectrum of emission and absorption lines. It is called the chromosphere from the Greek root chroma, meaning colour, because the chromosphere is visible as a coloured flash at the beginning and end of total solar eclipses. The temperature of the chromosphere increases gradually with altitude, ranging up to around 20,000 K near the top. In the upper part of the chromosphere helium becomes partially ionised.

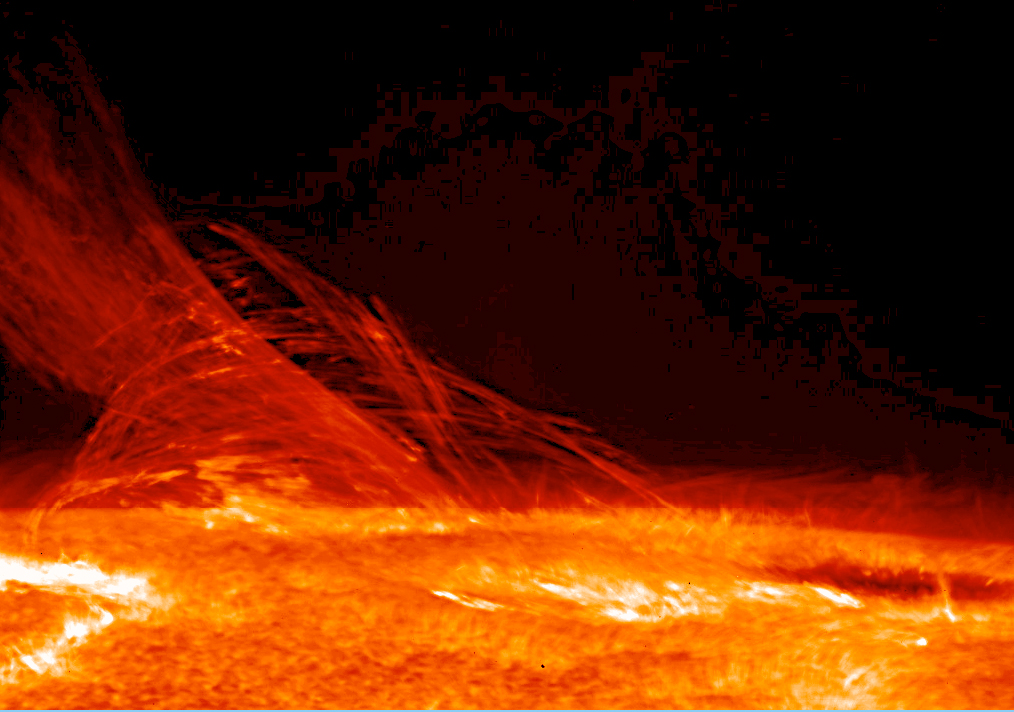
The Sun's transition region taken by Hinode's Solar Optical Telescope

The chromosphere and overlying corona are separated by a thin (about 200 km) transition region where the temperature rises rapidly from around 20,000 K in the upper chromosphere to coronal temperatures closer to 1,000,000 K. The temperature increase is facilitated by the full ionisation of helium in the transition region, which significantly reduces radiative cooling of the plasma. The transition region does not occur at a well-defined altitude, but forms a kind of nimbus around chromospheric features such as spicules and filaments, and is in constant, chaotic motion. The transition region is not easily visible from Earth's surface, but is readily observable from space by instruments sensitive to extreme ultraviolet.

==== Corona ====
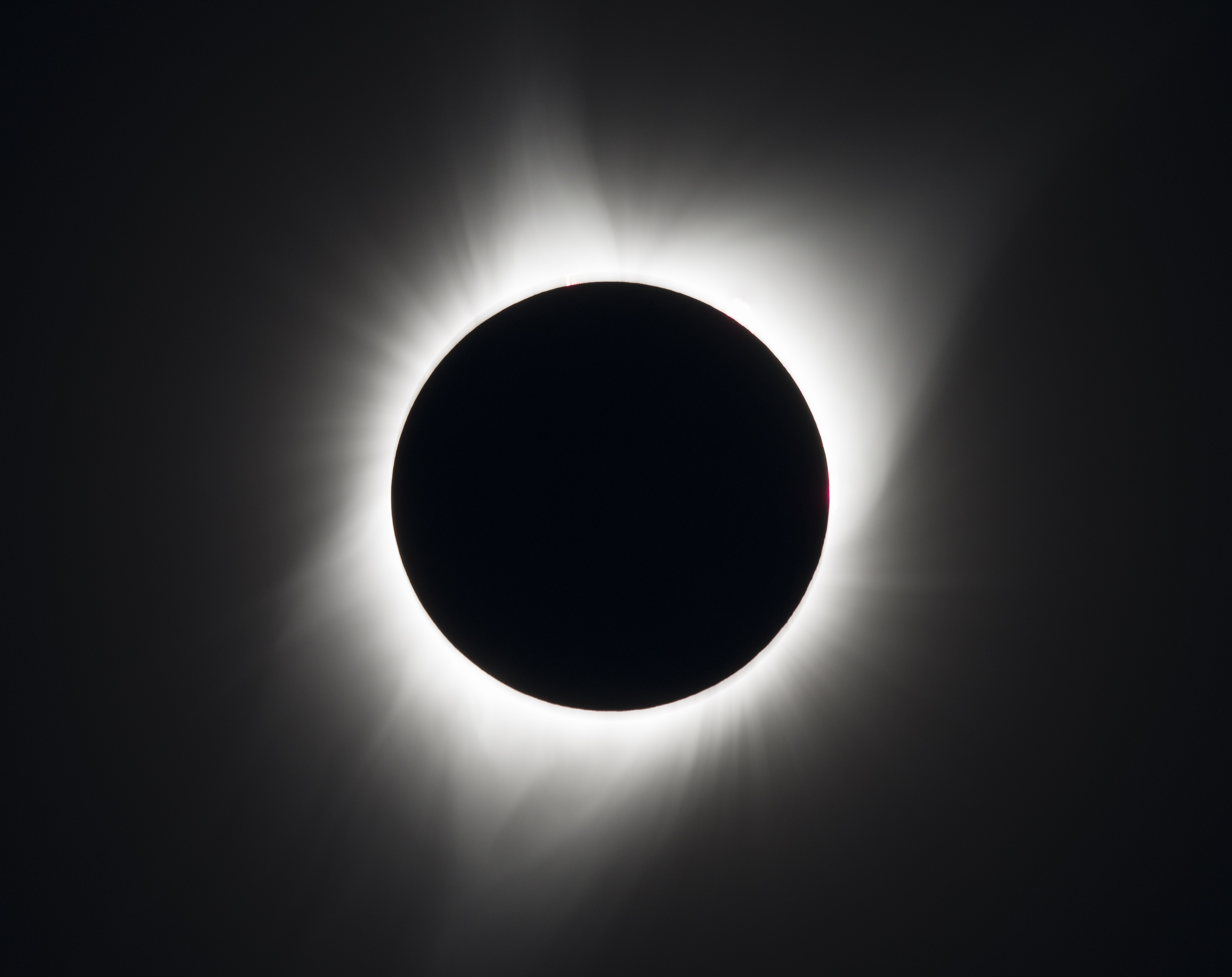
During a total solar eclipse the solar corona can be seen with the naked eye.

The corona is the next layer of the Sun. The low corona, near the surface of the Sun, has a particle density around 10^{15} m^{−3} to 10^{16} m^{−3}. (Note: Earth's atmosphere near sea level has a particle density of about 2×10^{25} m^{−3}.) The average temperature of the corona and solar wind is about 1,000,000–2,000,000 K; however, in the hottest regions it is 8,000,000–20,000,000 K. Although no complete theory yet exists to account for the temperature of the corona, at least some of its heat is known to be from magnetic reconnection.

The outer boundary of the corona is located where the radially increasing, large-scale solar wind speed is equal to the radially decreasing Alfvén wave phase speed. This defines a closed, nonspherical surface, referred to as the Alfvén critical surface, below which coronal flows are sub-Alfvénic and above which the solar wind is super-Alfvénic. The height at which this transition occurs varies across space and with solar activity, reaching its lowest near solar minimum and its highest near solar maximum. In April 2021 the surface was crossed for the first time at heliocentric distances ranging from 16 to 20 solar radii by the Parker Solar Probe. Predictions of its full possible extent have placed its full range within 8 to 30 solar radii.

=== Heliosphere ===
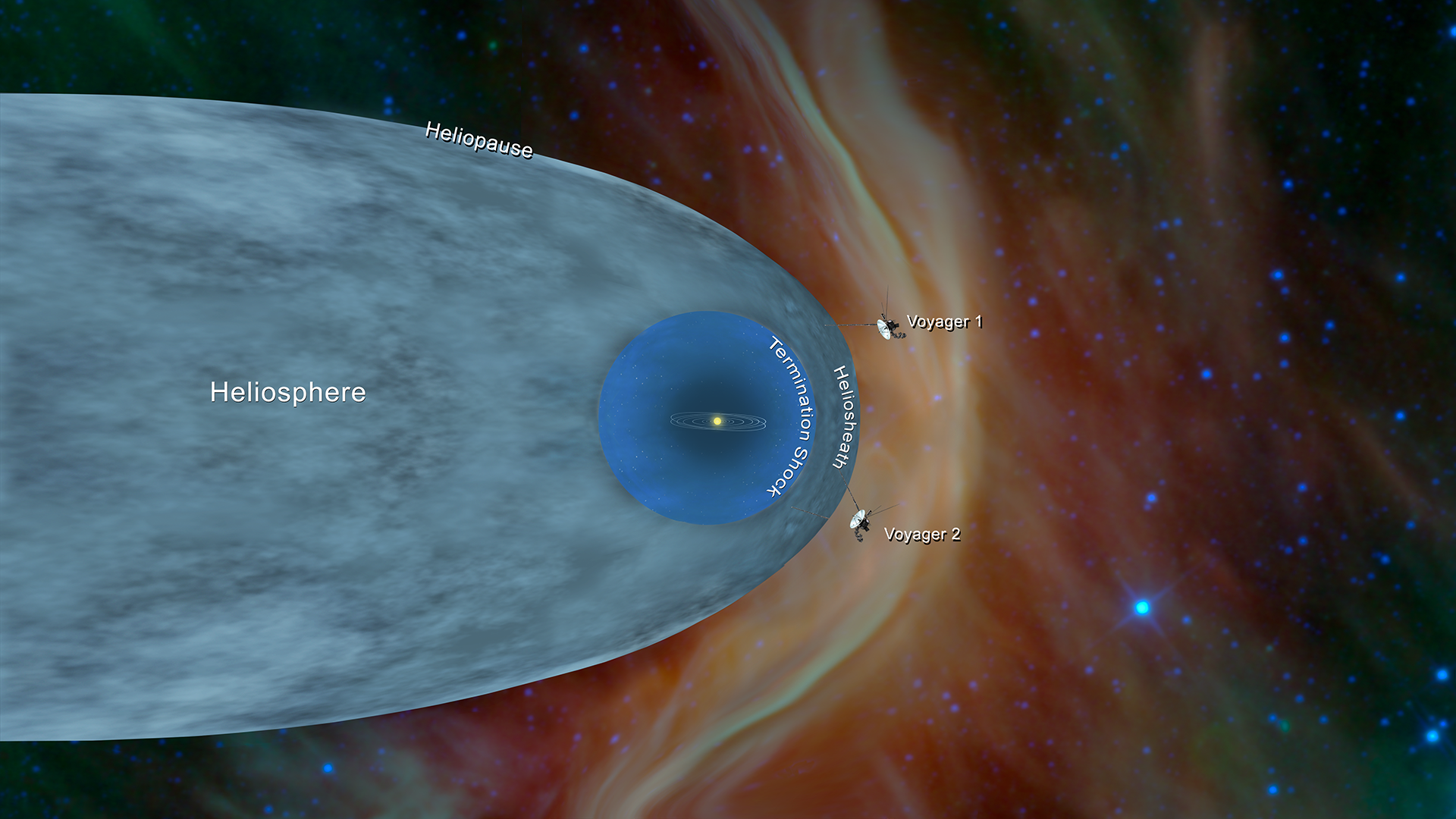
Depiction of the heliosphere

The heliosphere is defined as the region of space where the solar wind dominates over the interstellar medium. Turbulence and dynamic forces in the heliosphere cannot affect the shape of the solar corona within, because the information can only travel at the speed of Alfvén waves. The solar wind travels outward continuously through the heliosphere, forming the solar magnetic field into a spiral shape, until it impacts the heliopause more than 50 au (7.5 billion km) from the Sun. In December 2004, the Voyager 1 probe passed through a shock front that is thought to be part of the heliopause. In late 2012, Voyager 1 recorded a marked increase in cosmic ray collisions and a sharp drop in lower energy particles from the solar wind, which suggested that the probe had passed through the heliopause and entered the interstellar medium, and indeed did so on 25 August 2012, at approximately 122 au (18.3 billion km) from the Sun. The heliosphere has a heliotail which stretches out behind it due to the Sun's peculiar motion through the galaxy.

== Light, radiation, and observation ==
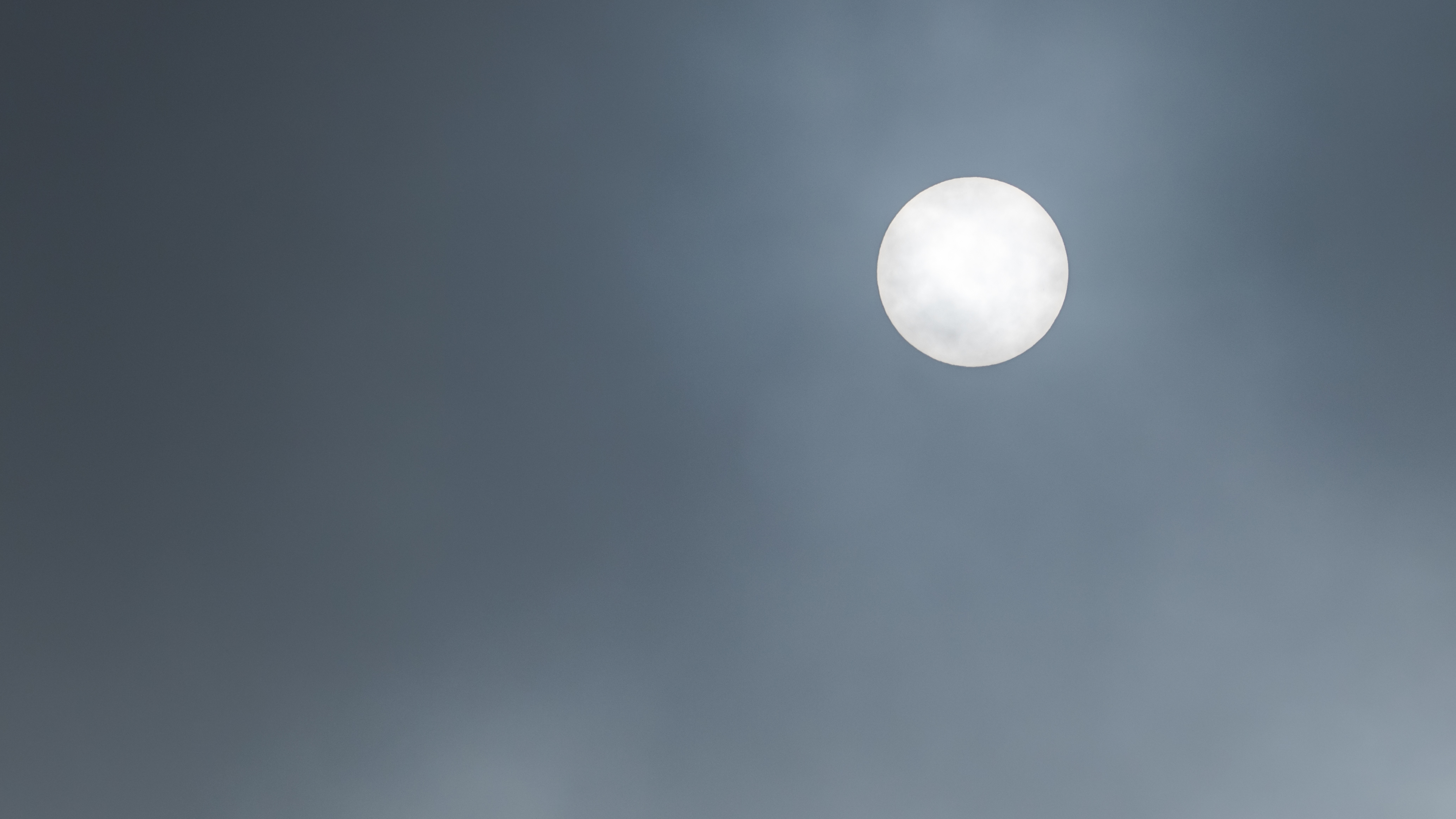
The Sun seen through a light fog

Energy from the Sun supports life on Earth by photosynthesis, allows vision in animals, and drives Earth's climate and weather. The Sun is by far the brightest object in the Earth's sky, with an apparent magnitude of −26.74. This is just less than 13 billion times brighter than the next brightest star, Sirius, which has an apparent magnitude of −1.46.

The solar constant is the amount of power that the Sun deposits per unit area that is directly exposed to sunlight. The solar constant is equal to approximately 1,368 W/m^{2} (watts per square metre) at a distance of one astronomical unit (au) from the Sun (that is, at or near Earth's orbit). Sunlight on the surface of Earth is attenuated by Earth's atmosphere, so that less power arrives at the surface, closer to 1,000 W/m^{2} (in clear conditions when the Sun is near the zenith). Sunlight at the top of Earth's atmosphere is composed (by total energy) of about 50% infrared light, 40% visible light, and 10% ultraviolet light. The atmosphere filters out over 70% of solar ultraviolet, especially at the shorter wavelengths.

=== Visible light and observation ===
The Sun's colour is white, with a CIE colour-space index near (0.3, 0.3), when viewed from space or when the Sun is high in the sky. The Solar radiance per wavelength peaks in the green portion of the spectrum when viewed from space. When the Sun is very low in the sky, atmospheric scattering renders the Sun yellow, red, orange, or magenta, and in rare occasions even green or blue. Some cultures mentally picture the Sun as yellow and some even red; the cultural reasons for this are debated.

An optical phenomenon, known as a green flash, can sometimes be seen shortly after sunset or before sunrise. The flash is caused by light from the Sun just below the horizon being bent (usually through a temperature inversion) towards the observer. Light of shorter wavelengths (violet, blue, green) is bent more than that of longer wavelengths (yellow, orange, red) but the violet and blue light is scattered more, leaving light that is perceived as green.

==== Exposure to the eye ====
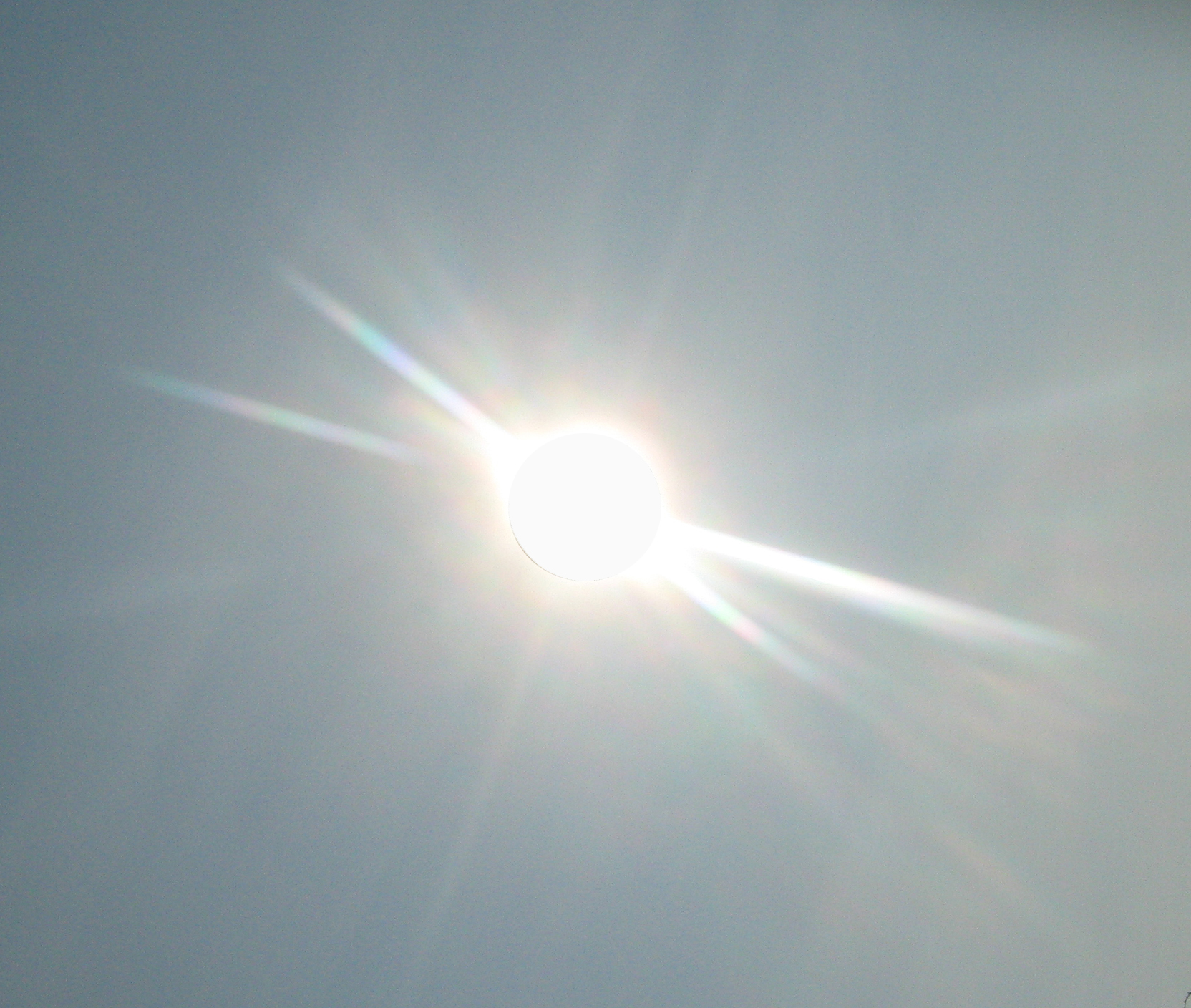
The Sun seen from Earth, with glare from the lenses. The eye also sees glare when the Sun is looked at directly.

The brightness of the Sun can cause pain from looking at it with the naked eye; however, doing so for brief periods is not hazardous for normal non-dilated eyes. Looking directly at the Sun, known as sungazing, causes phosphene visual artefacts and temporary partial blindness. It also delivers about 4 milliwatts of sunlight to the retina, slightly heating it and potentially causing damage in eyes that cannot respond properly to the brightness. Viewing of the direct Sun with the naked eye can cause UV-induced, sunburn-like lesions on the retina beginning after about 100 seconds, particularly under conditions where the UV light is intense and focused.

Viewing the Sun through light-concentrating optics such as binoculars may result in permanent damage to the retina without an appropriate filter. Some improvised filters that pass UV or IR rays can harm the eye at high brightness levels. Brief glances at the midday Sun through an unfiltered telescope can cause permanent damage.

During sunrise and sunset, sunlight is attenuated because of Rayleigh scattering and Mie scattering from a particularly long passage through Earth's atmosphere, and the Sun is sometimes faint enough to be viewed comfortably with the naked eye or safely with optics (provided there is no risk of bright sunlight suddenly appearing through a break between clouds). Hazy conditions, atmospheric dust, and high humidity contribute to this atmospheric attenuation.

=== Other radiation ===
Solar ultraviolet radiation ionises Earth's dayside upper atmosphere, creating its electrically conducting ionosphere. This radiation causes sunburn, and has other biological effects such as the production of vitamin D and sun tanning. It is the main cause of skin cancer. Ultraviolet light is strongly attenuated by Earth's ozone layer, so that the amount of UV varies greatly with latitude and has been partially responsible for many biological adaptations, including variations in human skin colour. Ultraviolet light from the Sun has antiseptic properties and can be used to sanitise tools and water.

High-energy gamma ray photons initially released with fusion reactions in the core are almost immediately absorbed by the solar plasma of the radiative zone, usually after travelling only a few millimetres. Re-emission happens in a random direction and usually at slightly lower energy. With this sequence of emissions and absorptions, it takes a long time for radiation to reach the Sun's surface. Estimates of the photon travel time range between 10,000 and 170,000 years. In contrast, it takes only 2.3 seconds for neutrinos, which account for about 2% of the total energy production of the Sun, to reach the surface. Because energy transport in the Sun is a process that involves photons in thermodynamic equilibrium with matter, the time scale of energy transport in the Sun is longer, on the order of 30,000,000 years. This is the time it would take the Sun to return to a stable state if the rate of energy generation in its core were suddenly changed.

Electron neutrinos are released by fusion reactions in the core, but, unlike photons, they rarely interact with matter, so almost all are able to escape the Sun immediately. However, measurements of the number of these neutrinos produced in the Sun are lower than theories predict by a factor of 3. In 2001, the discovery of neutrino oscillation resolved the discrepancy: the Sun emits the number of electron neutrinos predicted by the theory, but neutrino detectors were missing 2/3 of them because the neutrinos had changed flavour by the time they were detected.

== Magnetic activity ==
The Sun has a stellar magnetic field that varies across its surface. Its polar field is 1–2 gauss (0.0001–0.0002 T), whereas the field is typically 3,000 gauss (0.3 T) in features on the Sun called sunspots and 10–100 gauss (0.001–0.01 T) in solar prominences. The magnetic field varies in time and location. The quasi-periodic 11-year solar cycle is the most prominent variation in which the number and size of sunspots waxes and wanes.

The solar magnetic field extends well beyond the Sun itself. The electrically conducting solar wind plasma carries the Sun's magnetic field into space, forming what is called the interplanetary magnetic field. In an approximation known as ideal magnetohydrodynamics, plasma only moves along magnetic field lines. As a result, the outward-flowing solar wind stretches the interplanetary magnetic field outward, forcing it into a roughly radial structure. For a simple dipolar solar magnetic field, with opposite hemispherical polarities on either side of the solar magnetic equator, a thin current sheet is formed in the solar wind. At great distances, the rotation of the Sun twists the dipolar magnetic field and corresponding current sheet into an Archimedean spiral structure called the Parker spiral.

=== Sunspots ===
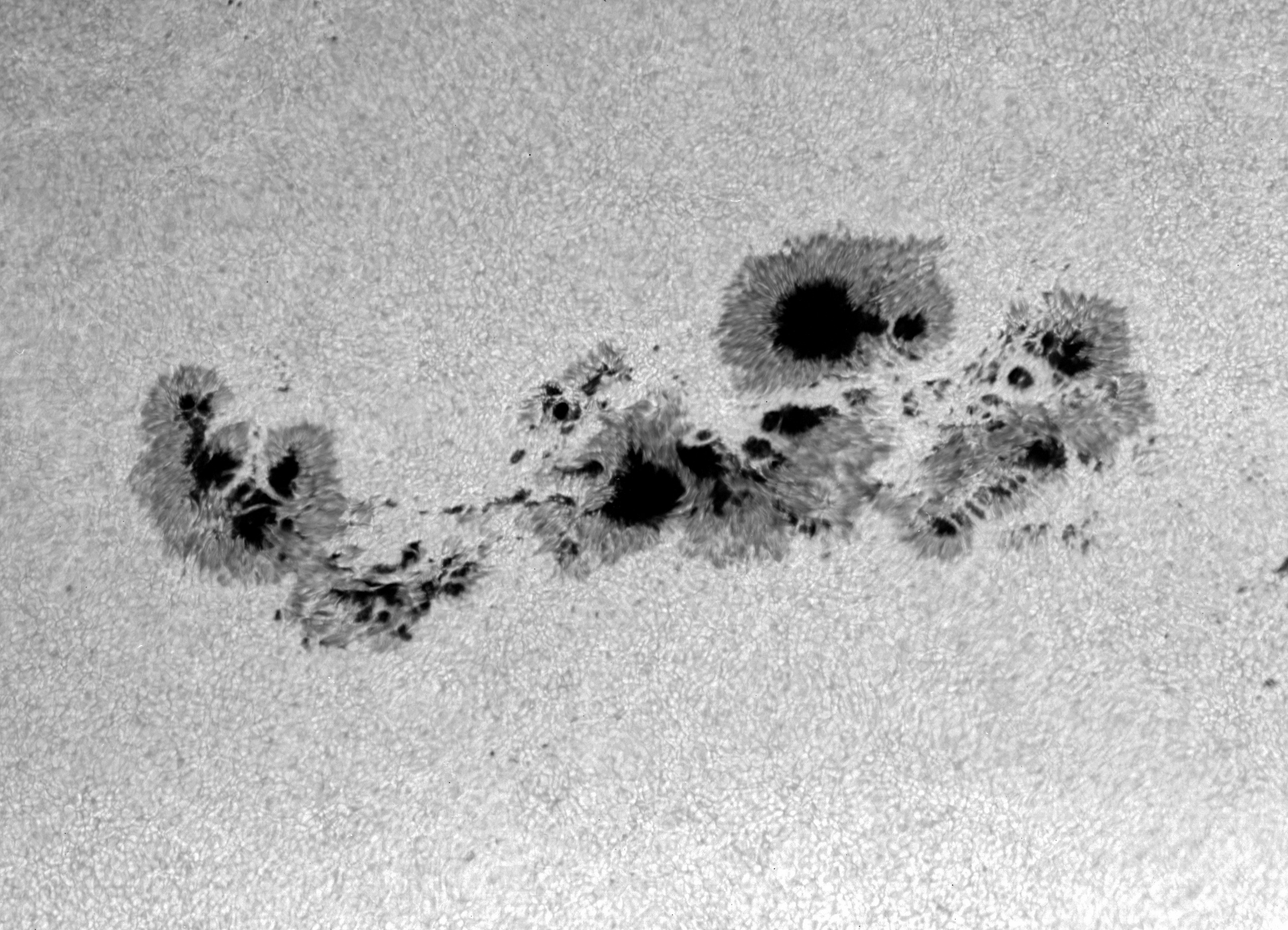
A large sunspot group observed in white light

Sunspots are visible as dark patches on the Sun's photosphere and correspond to concentrations of magnetic field where convective transport of heat is inhibited from the solar interior to the surface. As a result, sunspots are slightly cooler than the surrounding photosphere, so they appear dark. At a typical solar minimum, few sunspots are visible, and occasionally none can be seen at all. Those that do appear are at high solar latitudes. As the solar cycle progresses toward its maximum, sunspots tend to form closer to the solar equator, a phenomenon known as Spörer's law. The largest sunspots can be tens of thousands of kilometres across.

An 11-year sunspot cycle is half of a 22-year Babcock–Leighton dynamo cycle, which corresponds to an oscillatory exchange of energy between toroidal and poloidal solar magnetic fields. At solar-cycle maximum, the external poloidal dipolar magnetic field is near its dynamo-cycle minimum strength; but an internal toroidal quadrupolar field, generated through differential rotation within the tachocline, is near its maximum strength. At this point in the dynamo cycle, buoyant upwelling within the convective zone forces emergence of the toroidal magnetic field through the photosphere, giving rise to pairs of sunspots, roughly aligned east–west and having footprints with opposite magnetic polarities. The magnetic polarity of sunspot pairs alternates every solar cycle, a phenomenon described by Hale's law.

During the solar cycle's declining phase, energy shifts from the internal toroidal magnetic field to the external poloidal field, and sunspots diminish in number and size. At solar-cycle minimum, the toroidal field is, correspondingly, at minimum strength, sunspots are relatively rare, and the poloidal field is at its maximum strength. With the rise of the next 11-year sunspot cycle, differential rotation shifts magnetic energy back from the poloidal to the toroidal field, but with a polarity that is opposite to the previous cycle. The process carries on continuously, and in an idealised, simplified scenario, each 11-year sunspot cycle corresponds to a change, then, in the overall polarity of the Sun's large-scale magnetic field.

=== Solar activity ===
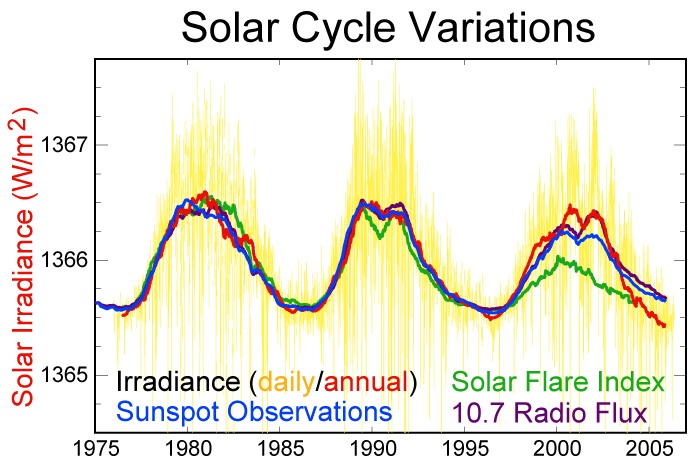
Measurements from 2005 of solar cycle variation during the previous 30 years

The Sun's magnetic field leads to many effects that are collectively called solar activity. Solar flares and coronal mass ejections tend to occur at sunspot groups. Slowly changing high-speed streams of solar wind are emitted from coronal holes at the photospheric surface. Both coronal mass ejections and high-speed streams of solar wind carry plasma and the interplanetary magnetic field outward into the Solar System. The effects of solar activity on Earth include auroras at moderate to high latitudes and the disruption of radio communications and electric power. Solar activity is thought to have played a large role in the formation and evolution of the Solar System.

Changes in solar irradiance over the 11-year solar cycle have been correlated with changes in sunspot number. The solar cycle influences space weather conditions, including those surrounding Earth. For example, in the 17th century, the solar cycle appeared to have stopped entirely for several decades; few sunspots were observed during a period known as the Maunder minimum. This coincided in time with the era of the Little Ice Age, when Europe experienced unusually cold temperatures. Earlier extended minima have been discovered through analysis of tree rings and appear to have coincided with lower-than-average global temperatures.

=== Coronal heating ===
Unsolved problem in astronomy
Why is the Sun's corona so much hotter than the Sun's surface?
More unsolved problems in astronomy

The temperature of the photosphere is approximately 6,000 K, whereas the temperature of the corona reaches 1,000,000–2,000,000 K. The high temperature of the corona shows that it is heated by something other than direct heat conduction from the photosphere.

It is thought that the energy necessary to heat the corona is provided by turbulent motion in the convection zone below the photosphere, and two main mechanisms have been proposed to explain coronal heating. The first is wave heating, in which sound, gravitational or magnetohydrodynamic waves are produced by turbulence in the convection zone. These waves travel upward and dissipate in the corona, depositing their energy in the ambient matter in the form of heat. The other is magnetic heating, in which magnetic energy is continuously built up by photospheric motion and released through magnetic reconnection in the form of large solar flares and myriad similar but smaller events—nanoflares.

Currently, it is unclear whether waves are an efficient heating mechanism. All waves except Alfvén waves have been found to dissipate or refract before reaching the corona. In addition, Alfvén waves do not easily dissipate in the corona. The current research focus has therefore shifted toward flare heating mechanisms.

== Life phases ==
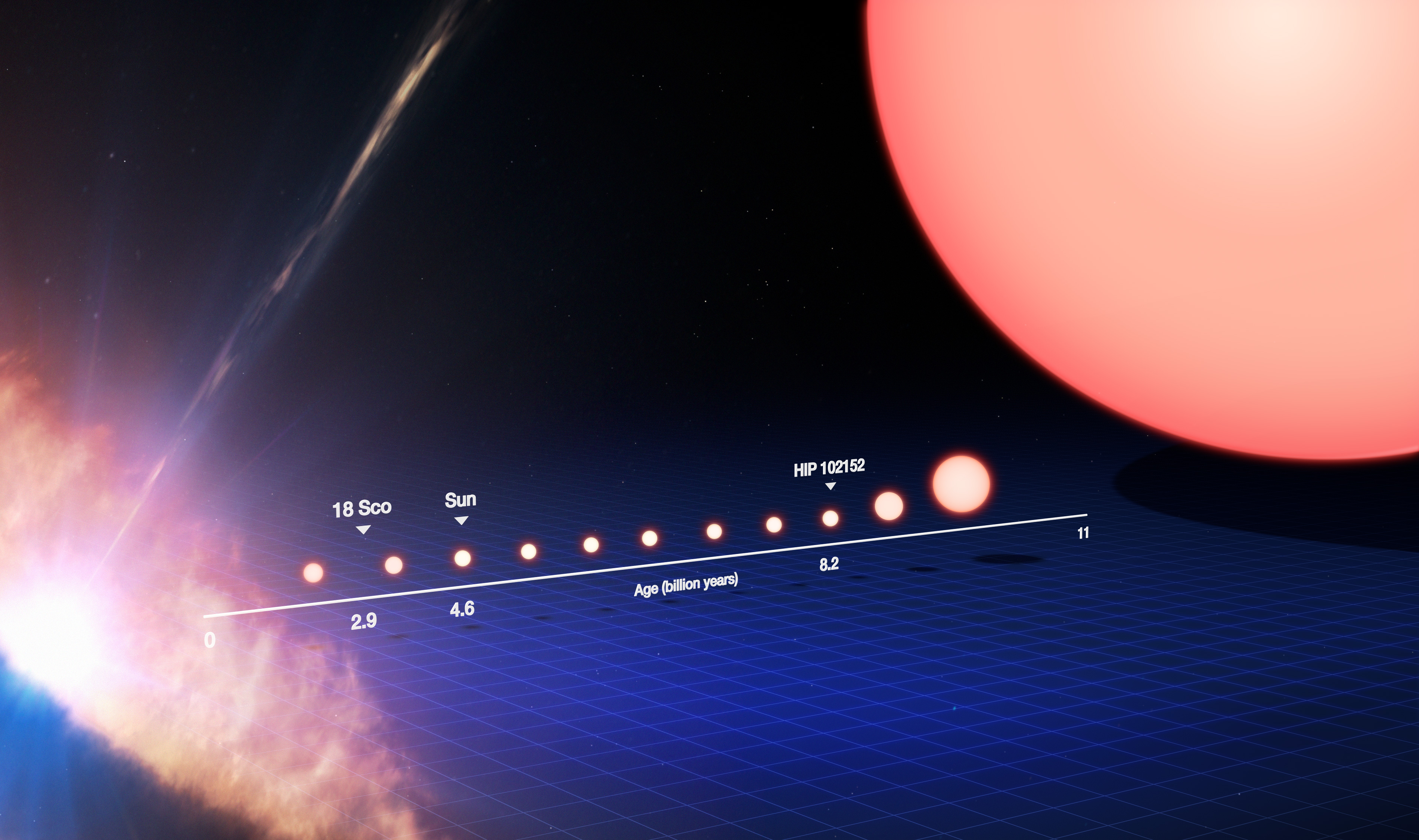
Overview of the evolution of a star like the Sun, from collapsing protostar at left to red giant stage at right

The Sun today is roughly halfway through the main-sequence portion of its life. It has not changed dramatically in over four billion years and will remain fairly stable for about five billion more. However, after hydrogen fusion in its core has stopped, the Sun will undergo dramatic changes, both internally and externally.

=== Formation ===
The Sun formed about 4.6 billion years ago from the collapse of part of a giant molecular cloud that consisted mostly of hydrogen and helium and that probably gave birth to many other stars. This age is estimated using computer models of stellar evolution and through nucleocosmochronology. The result is consistent with the radiometric date of the oldest Solar System material, at 4.567 billion years ago. Studies of ancient meteorites reveal traces of stable daughter nuclei of short-lived isotopes, such as iron-60, that form only in exploding, short-lived stars. This indicates that one or more supernovae must have occurred near the location where the Sun formed. A shock wave from a nearby supernova would have triggered the formation of the Sun by compressing the matter within the molecular cloud and causing certain regions to collapse under their own gravity. As one fragment of the cloud collapsed it also began to rotate due to conservation of angular momentum and heat up with the increasing pressure. Gas and dust with too much angular momentum to fall into the new star circulate, forming a protoplanetary disk that would become the planets and other Solar System bodies. Gravity and pressure within the core of the cloud generated a lot of heat as it accumulated more matter from the surrounding disk, eventually triggering nuclear fusion.

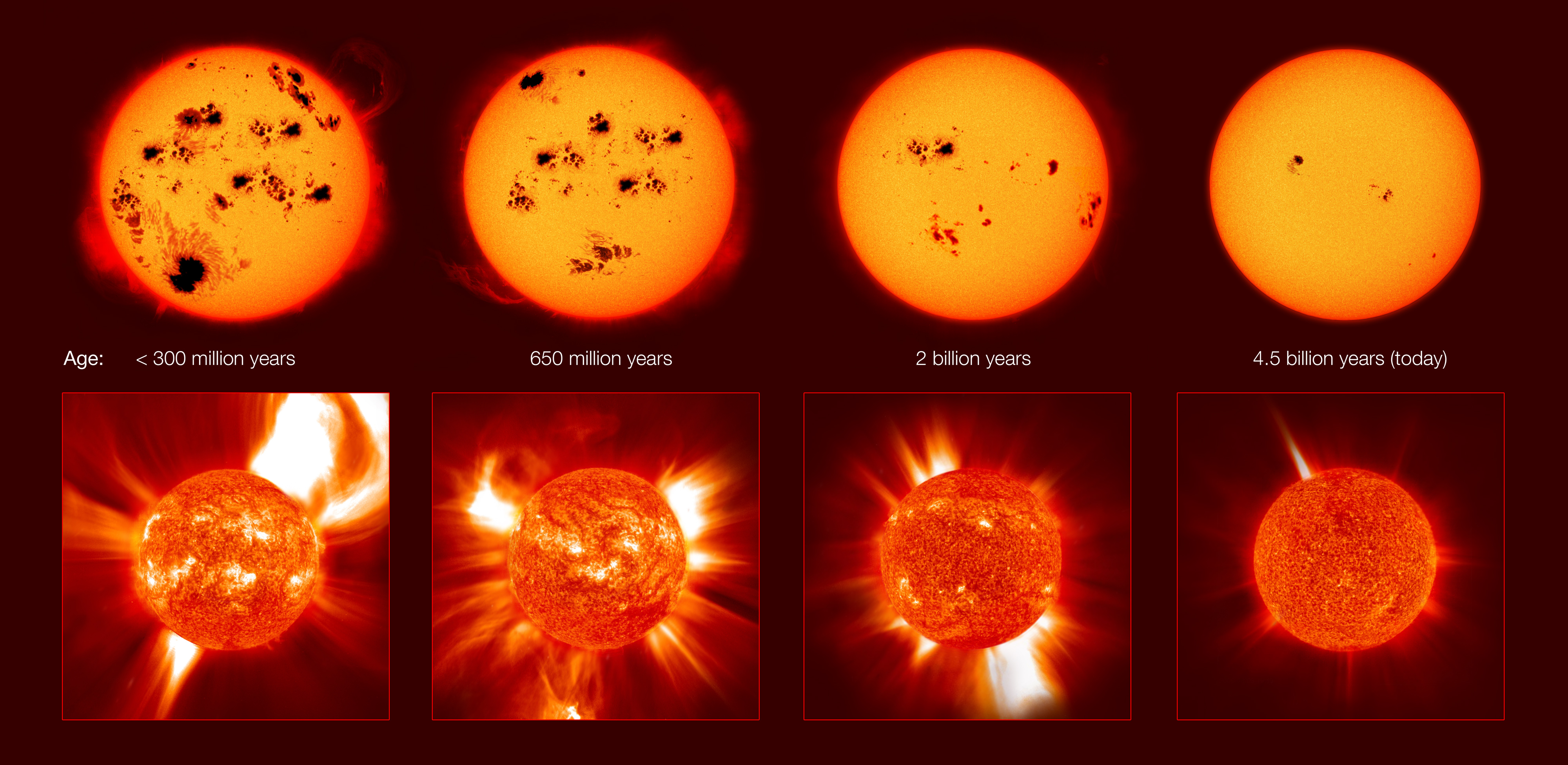
The violent youth of stars like the Sun

=== Main sequence ===
Evolution of a Sun-like star. The track of a one solar mass star on the Hertzsprung–Russell diagram is shown from the main sequence to the white dwarf stage.

The Sun is about halfway through its main-sequence stage, during which nuclear fusion reactions in its core fuse hydrogen into helium. Each second, more than four billion kilograms of matter are converted into energy within the Sun's core, producing neutrinos and solar radiation. At this rate, the Sun has so far converted around 100 times the mass of Earth into energy, about 0.03% of the total mass of the Sun. The Sun will spend a total of approximately 10 to 11 billion years as a main-sequence star before the red giant phase of the Sun. At the 8 billion year mark, the Sun will be at its hottest point according to the ESA's Gaia space observatory mission in 2022.

The Sun is gradually becoming hotter in its core, hotter at the surface, larger in radius, and more luminous during its time on the main sequence: since the beginning of its main sequence life, it has expanded in radius by 15% and the surface has increased in temperature from 5,620 K (9,660 °F) to 5,772 K (9,930 °F), resulting in a 48% increase in luminosity from 0.677 solar luminosities to its present-day 1.0 solar luminosity. This occurs because the helium atoms in the core have a higher mean molecular weight than the hydrogen atoms that were fused, resulting in less thermal pressure. The core is therefore shrinking, allowing the outer layers of the Sun to move closer to the centre, releasing gravitational potential energy. According to the virial theorem, half of this released gravitational energy goes into heating, which leads to a gradual increase in the rate at which fusion occurs and thus an increase in the luminosity. This process speeds up as the core gradually becomes denser. At present, it is increasing in brightness by about 1% every 100 million years. It will take at least 1 billion years from now to deplete liquid water from the Earth from such increase. After that, the Earth will cease to be able to support complex, multicellular life and the last remaining multicellular organisms on the planet will suffer a final, complete mass extinction.

=== After core hydrogen exhaustion ===
The size of the current Sun (now in the main sequence) compared to its estimated size during its red-giant phase in the future

The Sun does not have enough mass to explode as a supernova. Instead, when it runs out of hydrogen in the core in approximately 5 billion years, core hydrogen fusion will stop, and there will be nothing to prevent the core from contracting. The release of gravitational potential energy will make the Sun more luminous and end its main sequence phase, leading the Sun to expand over the next 2 billion years: first into a subgiant for a billion years, and then into a red giant. The heating due to gravitational contraction will further the Sun's expansion and lead to hydrogen fusion in a shell just outside its core, where unfused hydrogen remains, contributing to the increased luminosity, which will eventually reach more than 1,000 times its present value. When the Sun enters its red-giant branch (RGB) phase, it will engulf (and destroy) Mercury and Venus. Earth's orbit may initially expand to at most 1.5 au (220 million km; 140 million mi) because of the Sun's loss of mass. However, Earth's orbit could then start shrinking due to tidal forces (and, eventually, by drag from the Sun's lower chromosphere) so that it is engulfed by the Sun during the tip of the red-giant branch phase 7.59 billion years from now, 3.8 and 1 million years after Mercury and Venus have respectively suffered the same fate. However, this outcome remains uncertain as the Sun's total mass loss is uncertain. The Earth may survive the engulfment.

By the time the Sun reaches the tip of the red-giant branch, it will be about 256 times as big across as it is today, with a radius of 1.19 au (178 million km; 111 million mi). The Sun will spend around a billion years in the RGB and lose around a third of its mass.

After the red-giant branch, the Sun has approximately 120 million years' active life left, but much happens in that relatively brief period. First, the core (full of degenerate helium) ignites violently in the helium flash; it is estimated that 6% of the core—by then itself 40% of the Sun's mass—will be converted into carbon within a matter of minutes through the triple-alpha process. The Sun then shrinks to around 10 times its current size and 50 times its current luminosity, with a temperature a little lower than today's. It will eventually reach the red clump or horizontal branch, but a star of the Sun's metallicity does not evolve blueward along the horizontal branch. Instead, it becomes moderately larger and more luminous over about 100 million years as it begins fusing helium in its core.

When the helium is exhausted, the Sun will repeat the expansion it followed when the hydrogen in the core was exhausted. This time, however, it all happens faster, and the Sun becomes larger and more luminous. This is the asymptotic-giant-branch phase, when the Sun is alternately reacting hydrogen in a shell or helium in a deeper shell. After about 20 million years on the early asymptotic giant branch, the Sun becomes increasingly unstable, with rapid mass loss and thermal pulses that increase its size and luminosity for a few hundred years every 100,000 years or so. The thermal pulses become larger each time, with the later pulses pushing the luminosity to as much as 5,000 times the current level. Despite this, the Sun's maximum AGB radius will be less than its tip-RGB maximum, or 179 R_{☉}, or about 0.832 au (124.5 million km; 77.3 million mi).

Models vary depending on the rate and timing of mass loss. Models that have higher mass loss on the red-giant branch produce smaller, less luminous stars at the tip of the asymptotic giant branch, perhaps only 2,000 times the luminosity and less than 200 times the radius. For the Sun, four thermal pulses are predicted before it completely loses its outer envelope and starts to make a planetary nebula.

The post-asymptotic-giant-branch evolution is even faster. The luminosity stays approximately constant as the temperature increases, with the ejected half of the Sun's mass becoming ionised into a planetary nebula as the exposed core reaches 30,000 K (53,500 °F), as if it is in a sort of blue loop. The final naked core, a white dwarf, will have a temperature of over 100,000 K (180,000 °F) and contain an estimated 54.05% of the Sun's present-day mass. Simulations indicate that the Sun may be among the least massive stars capable of forming a planetary nebula. This nebula will disperse in about 10,000 years, but the white dwarf will survive for trillions of years as it gradually fades to a hypothetical super-dense black dwarf. As such, it would give off no more energy.

== Gravitational domain and influence ==
Location of the Sun within the Solar System, which extends to the edge of the Oort cloud where, at 125,000 to 230,000 au (2.0 to 3.6 ly), the Sun's gravitational sphere of influence ends.

The Sun has eight known planets orbiting it. This includes four terrestrial planets (Mercury, Venus, Earth, and Mars), two gas giants (Jupiter and Saturn), and two ice giants (Uranus and Neptune). The Solar System also has nine bodies generally considered as dwarf planets and some more candidates, an asteroid belt, numerous comets, and a large number of icy bodies which lie beyond the orbit of Neptune. Six of the planets and many smaller bodies also have their own natural satellites: in particular, the satellite systems of Jupiter, Saturn, and Uranus are in some ways like miniature versions of the Sun's system.

One astronomical unit (about 150 million kilometres; 93 million miles) (au) was originally defined as the mean distance between the centres of the Sun and the Earth. The instantaneous distance varies by about ±2.5 million kilometres (1.6 million miles) as Earth moves from perihelion around 3 January to aphelion around 4 July. At its average distance, light travels from the Sun's horizon to Earth's horizon in about 8 minutes and 20 seconds. In 2012 the au was defined to be 149,597,870,700 m.

Apparent motion of the Solar System barycentre with respect to the Sun

The Sun is moved by the gravitational pull of the planets. The centre of the Sun moves around the Solar System barycentre, within a range from 0.1 to 2.2 solar radii. The Sun's motion around the barycentre approximately repeats every 179 years, rotated by about 30° due primarily to the synodic period of Jupiter and Saturn. This motion is mainly due to Jupiter, Saturn, Uranus, and Neptune. For some periods of several decades (when Neptune and Uranus are in opposition) the motion is rather regular, forming a trefoil pattern, whereas between these periods it appears more chaotic. After 179 years (nine times the synodic period of Jupiter and Saturn), the pattern more or less repeats, but rotated by about 24°. The orbits of the inner planets, including of the Earth, are similarly displaced by the same gravitational forces, so the movement of the Sun has little effect on the relative positions of the Earth and the Sun or on solar irradiance on the Earth as a function of time.

The Sun's gravitational field is estimated to dominate the gravitational forces of surrounding objects out to about two light-years (125,000 au). Lower estimates for the radius of the Oort cloud, by contrast, do not place it farther than 50,000 au. Most of the mass is orbiting in the region between 3,000 and 100,000 au. The furthest known objects, such as Comet West, have aphelia around 70,000 au from the Sun. The Sun's Hill sphere with respect to the galactic nucleus, the effective range of its gravitational influence, was calculated by G. A. Chebotarev to be 230,000 au.

== Overall location ==
=== Celestial neighbourhood ===
Diagram of the Local Interstellar Cloud, the G-Cloud and surrounding stars. As of 2022, the exact position of the Solar System within the interstellar clouds remains an unresolved question in astronomy.

Within 10 light-years of the Sun there are relatively few stars, the closest being the triple star system Alpha Centauri, which is about 4.4 light-years away and may be in the Local Bubble's G-Cloud. Alpha Centauri A and B are a closely tied pair of Sun-like stars, whereas the closest star to the Sun, the small red dwarf Proxima Centauri, orbits the pair at a distance of 0.2 light-years. In 2016, a potentially habitable exoplanet was found to be orbiting Proxima Centauri, called Proxima Centauri b, the closest confirmed exoplanet to the Sun.

The Solar System is surrounded by the Local Interstellar Cloud, although it is not clear if it is embedded in the Local Interstellar Cloud or if it lies just outside the cloud's edge. Multiple other interstellar clouds exist in the region within 300 light-years of the Sun, known as the Local Bubble. The latter feature is an hourglass-shaped cavity or superbubble in the interstellar medium roughly 300 light-years across. The bubble is suffused with high-temperature plasma, suggesting that it may be the product of several recent supernovae.

The Local Bubble is a small superbubble compared to the neighboring wider Radcliffe Wave and Split linear structures (formerly Gould Belt), each of which are some thousands of light-years in length. All these structures are part of the Orion Arm, which contains most of the stars in the Milky Way that are visible to the unaided eye.

Groups of stars form together in star clusters, before dissolving into co-moving associations. A prominent grouping that is visible to the naked eye is the Ursa Major moving group, which is around 80 light-years away within the Local Bubble. The nearest star cluster is Hyades, which lies at the edge of the Local Bubble. The closest star-forming regions are the Corona Australis Molecular Cloud, the Rho Ophiuchi cloud complex and the Taurus molecular cloud; the latter lies just beyond the Local Bubble and is part of the Radcliffe wave.

Stellar flybys that pass within 0.8 light-years of the Sun occur roughly once every 100,000 years. The closest well-measured approach was Scholz's Star, which approached to ~50,000 AU of the Sun some ~70 thousand years ago, likely passing through the outer Oort cloud. There is a 1% chance every billion years that a star will pass within 100 AU of the Sun, potentially disrupting the Solar System.

=== Galactic motion ===
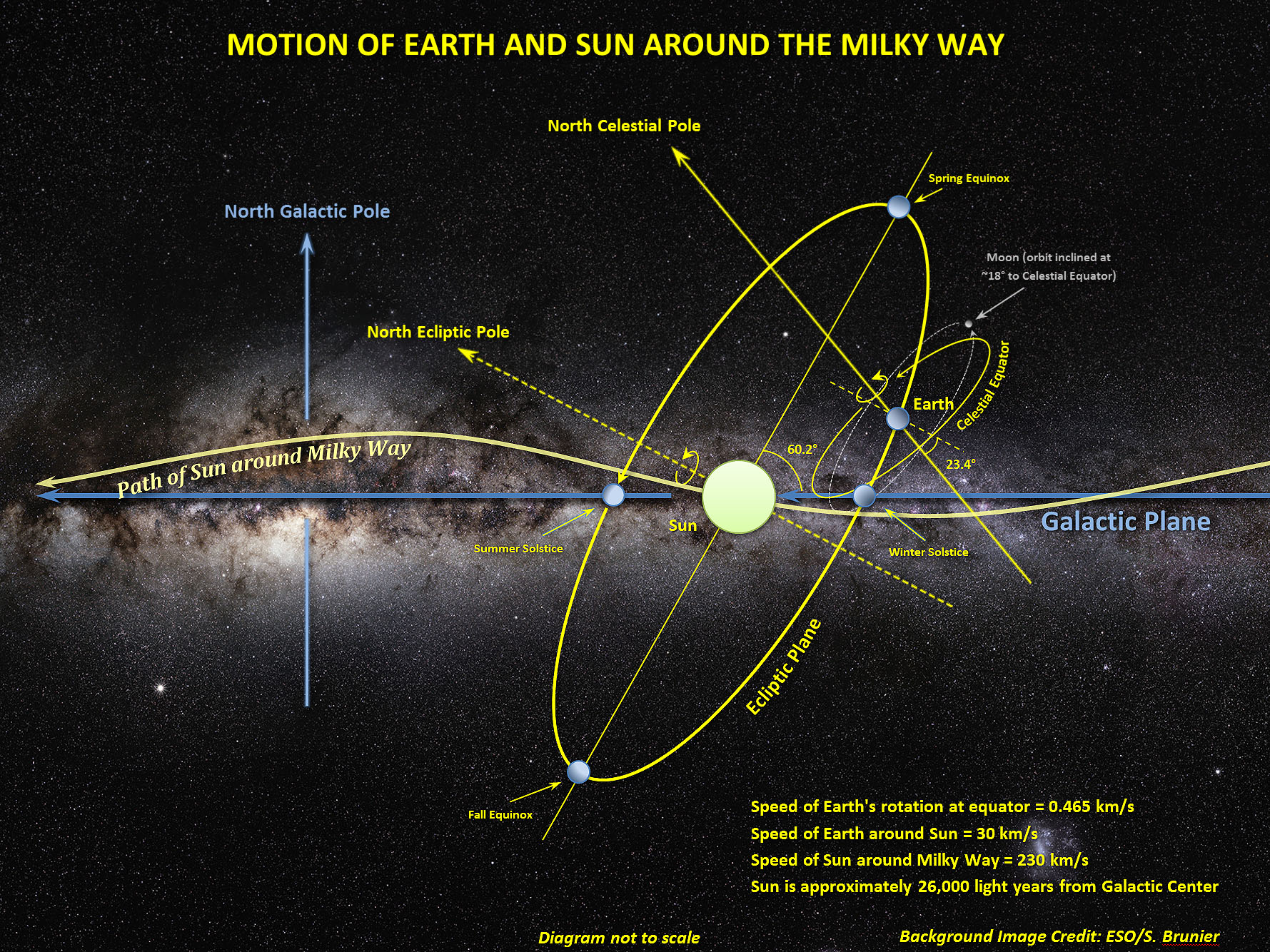
The general motion and orientation of the Sun, with Earth and the Moon as its Solar System satellites

The Sun, taking along the whole Solar System, orbits the galaxy's centre of mass at an average speed of 230 km/s (828,000 km/h), taking about 220–250 million Earth years to complete a revolution (a galactic year), having done so about 20 times since the Sun's formation. The direction of the Sun's motion, the Solar apex, is roughly in the direction of the star Vega. In the past the Sun likely moved through the Orion–Eridanus Superbubble, before entering the Local Bubble.

The Sun's idealised orbit around the Galactic Centre in an artist's top-down depiction of the current layout of the Milky Way

As the Sun goes around the galaxy it also moves with respect to the average motion of the other stars around it. A simple model predicts that in a frame of reference rotating with the galaxy, the Sun moves in an ellipse, circulating around a point that is itself going around the galaxy. The period of the Sun's circulation around the point is about 166 million years, shorter than the time it takes for the point to go around the galaxy. The length of the ellipse is around 1760 parsecs and its width around 1170 parsecs. (Compare this to the distance of the Sun from the centre of the galaxy, around 7 or 8 kiloparsecs.) At the same time, the Sun moves "north" and "south" of the galactic plane with a different period, around 83 million years, moving about 99 parsecs away from the plane. The point around which the Sun circulates takes around 240 million years to go once around the galaxy.

The Sun's orbit around the Milky Way is perturbed by the non-uniform mass distribution in Milky Way, such as that in and between the galactic spiral arms. However, it is statistically unlikely that the Sun has migrated very far radially from its birth radius within the galaxy. It has been argued that the Sun's passage through the higher density spiral arms often coincides with mass extinctions on Earth, perhaps due to increased impact events. It takes the Solar System about 225–250 million years to complete one orbit through the Milky Way (a galactic year), so it is thought to have completed 20–25 orbits during the lifetime of the Sun. The orbital speed of the Solar System about the centre of the Milky Way is approximately 251 km/s (156 mi/s). At this speed, it takes around 1,190 years for the Solar System to travel a distance of 1 light-year, or 7 days to travel 1 AU.

The Milky Way is moving with respect to the cosmic microwave background radiation (CMB) in the direction of the constellation Hydra with a speed of 550 km/s, but since the Sun is moving with respect to the Galactic Centre in the direction of Cygnus (galactic longitude 90°; latitude 0°) at more than 200 km/s, the resultant velocity with respect to the CMB is about 370 km/s in the direction of Crater or Leo (galactic latitude 264°, latitude 48°). This is 132° away from Cygnus.

== Observational history ==
=== Early understanding ===
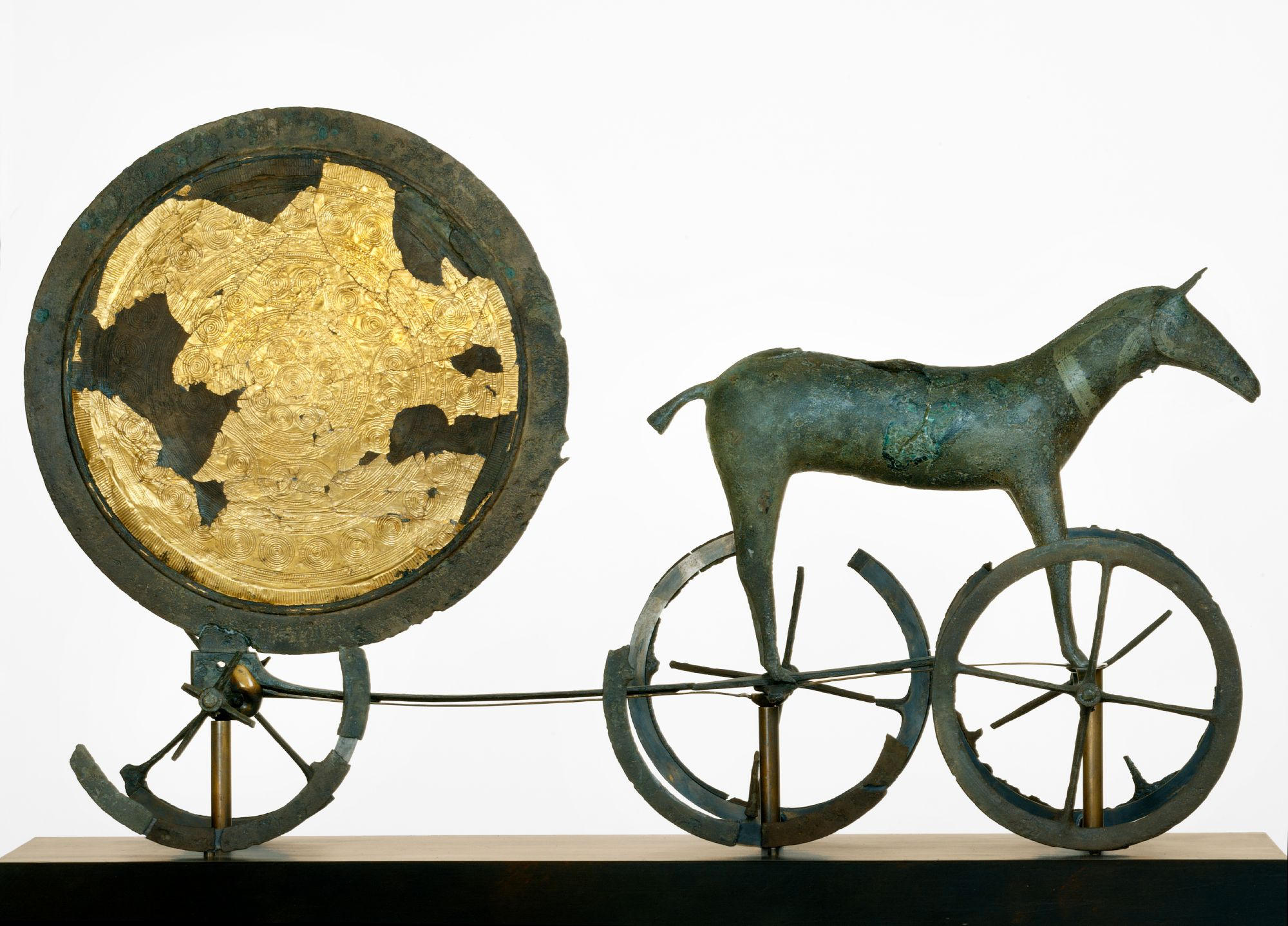
The Trundholm sun chariot pulled by a horse is a sculpture believed to be illustrating an important part of Nordic Bronze Age mythology.

In many prehistoric and ancient cultures, the Sun was thought to be a solar deity or other supernatural entity. In the early 1st millennium BC, Babylonian astronomers observed that the Sun's motion along the ecliptic is not uniform, though they did not know why; it is today known that this is due to the movement of Earth in an elliptic orbit, moving faster when it is nearer to the Sun at perihelion and moving slower when it is farther away at aphelion.

One of the first people to offer a scientific or philosophical explanation for the Sun was the Greek philosopher Anaxagoras. He reasoned that it was a giant flaming ball of metal even larger than the land of the Peloponnesus and that the Moon reflected the light of the Sun. Eratosthenes estimated the distance between Earth and the Sun in the 3rd century BC as "of stadia myriads 400 and 80000", the translation of which is ambiguous, implying either 4,080,000 stadia (755,000 km) or 804,000,000 stadia (148 to 153 million kilometres or 0.99 to 1.02 AU); the latter value is correct to within a few per cent. In the 1st century AD, Ptolemy estimated the distance as 1,210 times the radius of Earth, approximately 7.71 million kilometres (0.0515 AU).

The theory that the Sun is the centre around which the planets orbit was first proposed by the ancient Greek Aristarchus of Samos in the 3rd century BC, and later adopted by Seleucus of Seleucia. This view was developed in a more detailed mathematical model of a heliocentric system in the 16th century by Nicolaus Copernicus.

=== Development of scientific understanding ===
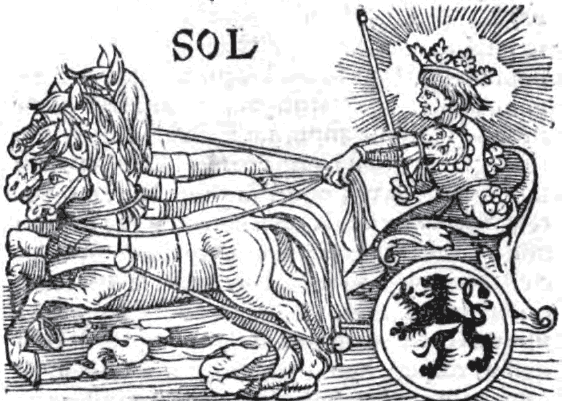
Sol, the Personification of the Sun, from a 1550 edition of Guido Bonatti's Liber astronomiae

Observations of sunspots were recorded by Chinese astronomers during the Han dynasty (202 BC – AD 220), with records of their observations being maintained for centuries. Averroes also provided a description of sunspots in the 12th century. The invention of the telescope in the early 17th century permitted detailed observations of sunspots by Thomas Harriot, Galileo Galilei and other astronomers. Galileo posited that sunspots were on the surface of the Sun rather than small objects passing between Earth and the Sun.

Medieval Islamic astronomical contributions include al-Battani's discovery that the direction of the Sun's apogee (the place in the Sun's orbit against the fixed stars where it seems to be moving slowest) is changing. In modern heliocentric terms, this is caused by a gradual motion of the aphelion of the Earth's orbit. Ibn Yunus recorded the Sun's position more than 10,000 times over many years, using a large astrolabe.

The first reasonably accurate distance to the Sun was determined in 1684 by Giovanni Domenico Cassini. Knowing that direct measurements of the solar parallax were difficult, he chose to measure the Martian parallax. Having sent Jean Richer to Cayenne, part of French Guiana, for simultaneous measurements, Cassini in Paris determined the parallax of Mars when Mars was at its closest to Earth in 1672. Using the circumference distance between the two observations, Cassini calculated the Earth–Mars distance, then used Kepler's laws to determine the Earth–Sun distance. His value, about 10% smaller than modern values, was much larger than all previous estimates.

From an observation of a transit of Venus in 1032, Ibn Sina concluded that Venus was closer to Earth than the Sun. In 1677, Edmond Halley observed a transit of Mercury across the Sun, leading him to realise that observations of the solar parallax of a planet (more ideally using the transit of Venus) could be used to trigonometrically determine the distances between Earth, Venus, and the Sun. Observations of the 1769 transit of Venus allowed astronomers to calculate the average Earth–Sun distance as 93,726,900 miles (150,838,800 km), only 0.8% greater than the modern value.

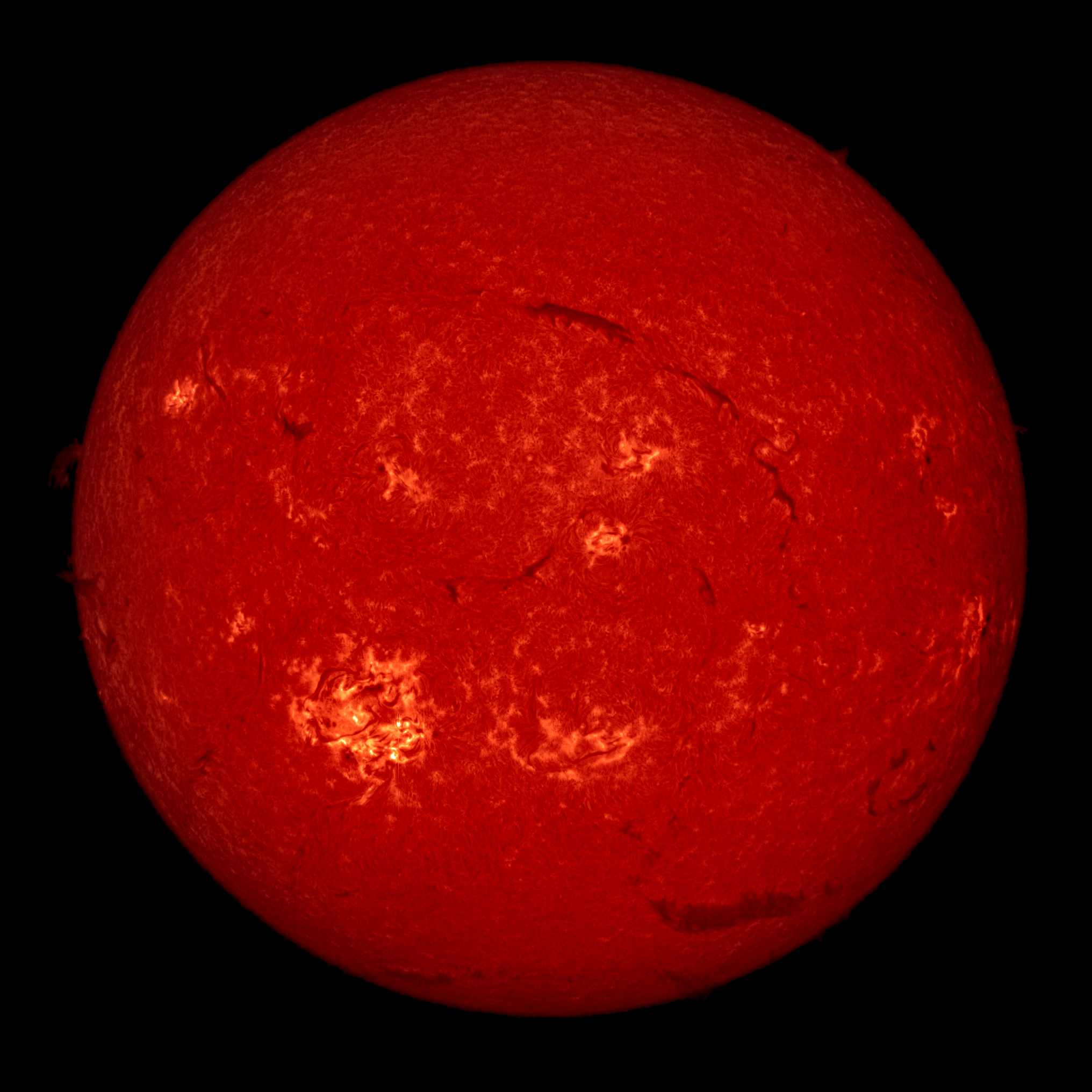
Sun as seen in Hydrogen-alpha light

In 1666, Isaac Newton observed the Sun's light using a prism, and showed that it is made up of light of many colours. In 1800, William Herschel discovered infrared radiation beyond the red part of the solar spectrum. The 19th century saw advancement in spectroscopic studies of the Sun; Joseph von Fraunhofer recorded more than 600 absorption lines in the spectrum, the strongest of which are still often referred to as Fraunhofer lines. The 20th century brought about several specialised systems for observing the Sun, especially at different narrowband wavelengths, such as those using Calcium-H (396.9 nm), Calcium-K (393.37 nm) and Hydrogen-alpha (656.46 nm) filtering.

During early studies of the optical spectrum of the photosphere, some absorption lines were found that did not correspond to any chemical elements then known on Earth. In 1868, Norman Lockyer hypothesised that these absorption lines were caused by a new element that he dubbed helium, after the Greek Sun god Helios. Twenty-five years later, helium was isolated on Earth.

In the early modern scientific era, the source of the Sun's energy was a significant puzzle. Lord Kelvin suggested that the Sun is a gradually cooling liquid body that is radiating an internal store of heat. Kelvin and Hermann von Helmholtz proposed a gravitational contraction mechanism to explain the energy output, but the resulting age estimate was only 20 million years, well short of the time span of at least 300 million years suggested by some geological discoveries of that time. In 1890, Lockyer proposed a meteoritic hypothesis for the formation and evolution of the Sun.

Not until 1904 was a documented solution offered. Ernest Rutherford suggested that the Sun's output could be maintained by an internal source of heat, and suggested radioactive decay as the source. Albert Einstein provided the essential clue to the source of the Sun's energy output with his mass–energy equivalence relation E = mc^{2}. In 1920, Sir Arthur Eddington proposed that the pressures and temperatures at the core of the Sun could produce a nuclear fusion reaction that merged hydrogen (protons) into helium nuclei, resulting in a production of energy from the net change in mass. The preponderance of hydrogen in the Sun was confirmed in 1925 by Cecilia Payne using the ionisation theory developed by Meghnad Saha. The theoretical concept of fusion was developed in the 1930s by the astrophysicists Subrahmanyan Chandrasekhar and Hans Bethe. Bethe calculated the details of the two main energy-producing nuclear reactions that power the Sun. In 1957, Margaret Burbidge, Geoffrey Burbidge, William Fowler and Fred Hoyle showed that most of the elements in the universe have been synthesised by nuclear reactions inside stars, some like the Sun.

=== Solar space missions ===
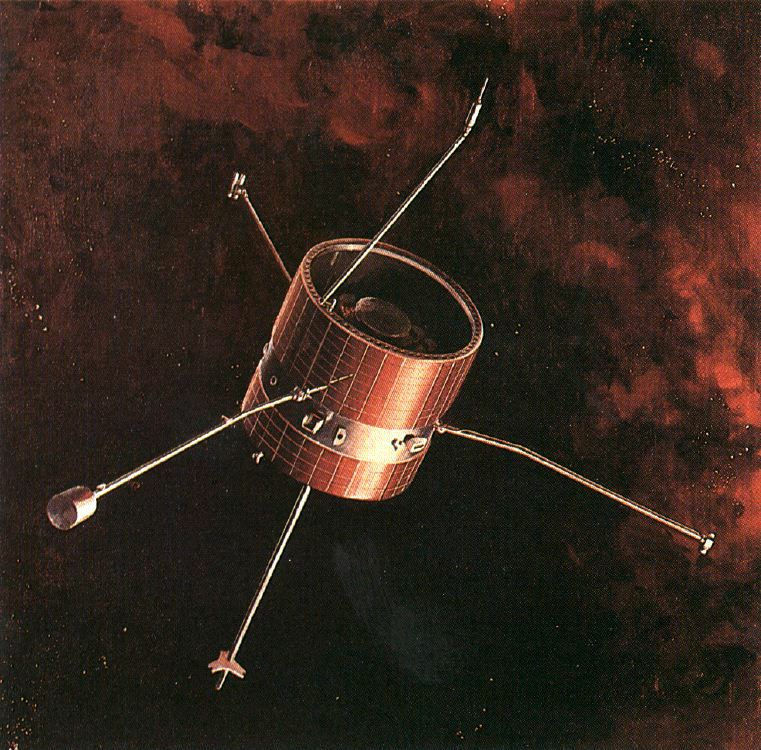
Pioneer 6, 7, 8, and 9

The first satellites designed for long-term observation of the Sun from interplanetary space were Pioneer 6, 7, 8, and 9, launched by NASA between 1959 and 1968. These probes orbited the Sun at a distance similar to that of Earth, and made the first detailed measurements of the solar wind and the solar magnetic field. Pioneer 9 operated for a particularly long time, transmitting data until May 1983.

In the 1970s, two Helios spacecraft and the Skylab Apollo Telescope Mount provided scientists with significant new data on solar wind and the solar corona. The Helios 1 and 2 probes were U.S.–German collaborations that studied the solar wind from an orbit carrying the spacecraft inside Mercury's orbit at perihelion. The Skylab space station, launched by NASA in 1973, included a solar observatory module called the Apollo Telescope Mount that was operated by astronauts resident on the station. Skylab made the first time-resolved observations of the solar transition region and of ultraviolet emissions from the solar corona. Discoveries included the first observations of coronal mass ejections, then called "coronal transients", and of coronal holes, now known to be intimately associated with the solar wind.

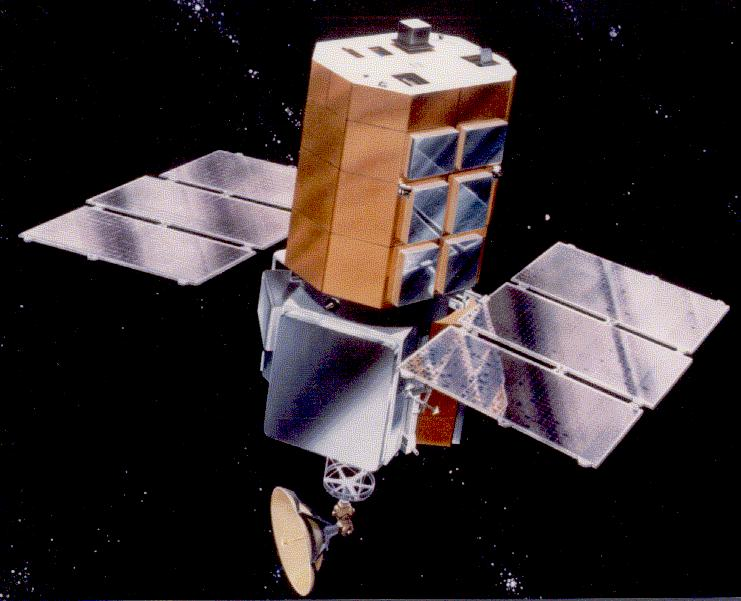
Drawing of a Solar Maximum Mission probe

In 1980, the Solar Maximum Mission probes were launched by NASA. This spacecraft was designed to observe gamma rays, X-rays and ultraviolet radiation from solar flares during a time of high solar activity and solar luminosity. Just a few months after launch, however, an electronics failure caused the probe to go into standby mode, and it spent three years in this inactive state. In 1984, Space Shuttle Challenger mission STS-41-C retrieved the satellite and repaired its electronics before re-releasing it into orbit. The Solar Maximum Mission subsequently acquired thousands of images of the solar corona before re-entering Earth's atmosphere in June 1989.

Launched in 1991, Japan's Yohkoh (Sunbeam) satellite observed solar flares at X-ray wavelengths. Mission data allowed scientists to identify several different types of flares and demonstrated that the corona away from regions of peak activity was much more dynamic and active than had previously been supposed. Yohkoh observed an entire solar cycle but went into standby mode when an annular eclipse in 2001 caused it to lose its lock on the Sun. It was destroyed by atmospheric re-entry in 2005.

The Solar and Heliospheric Observatory, jointly built by the European Space Agency and NASA, was launched on 2 December 1995. Originally intended to serve a two-year mission, SOHO remains in operation as of 2024. Situated at the Lagrangian point between Earth and the Sun (at which the gravitational pull from both is equal), SOHO has provided a constant view of the Sun at many wavelengths since its launch. Besides its direct solar observation, SOHO has enabled the discovery of a large number of comets, mostly tiny sungrazing comets that incinerate as they pass the Sun.

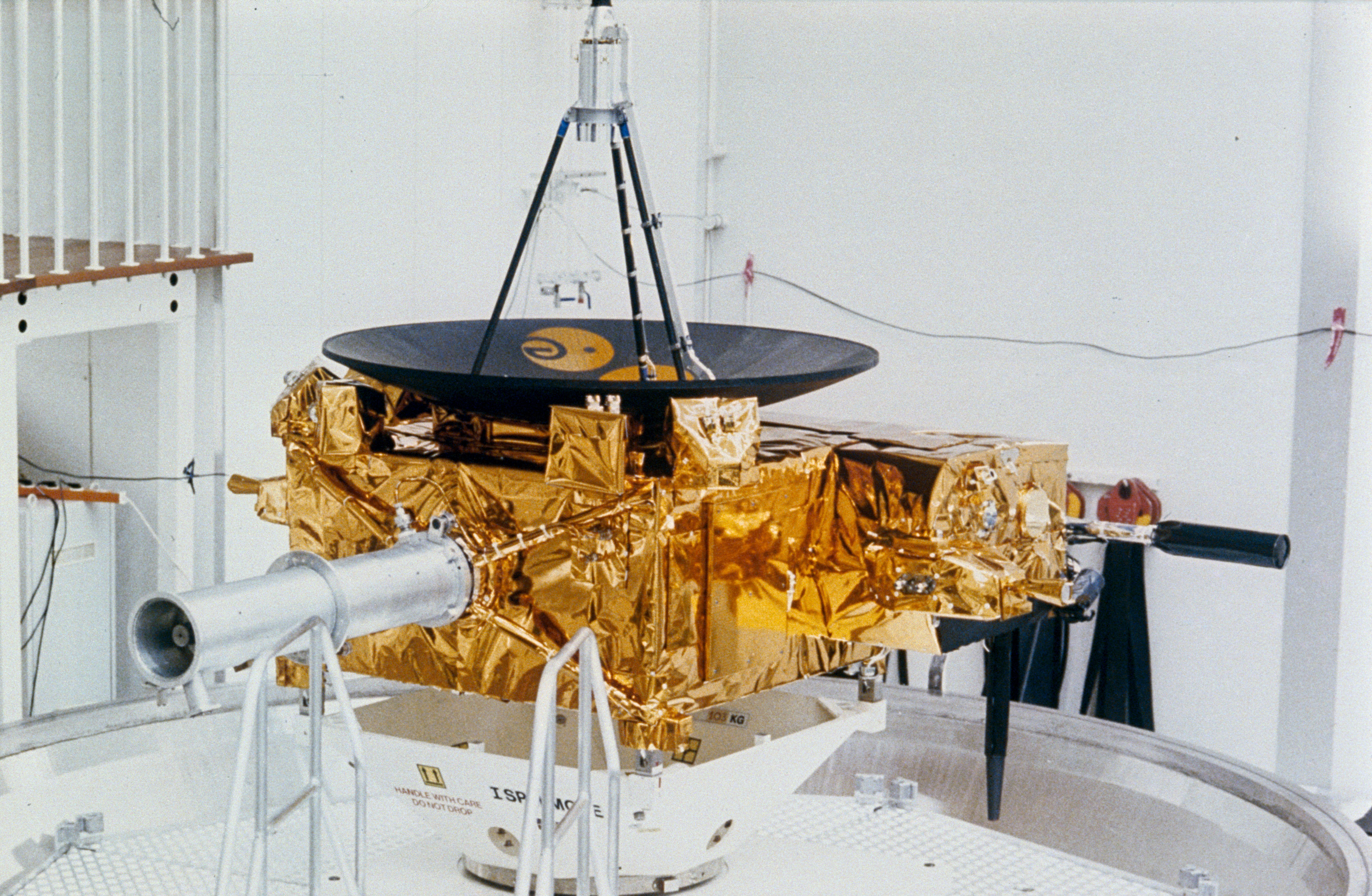
Ulysses spacecraft testing at the vacuum spin-balancing facility

All these satellites have observed the Sun from the plane of the ecliptic, and so have only observed its equatorial regions in detail. The Ulysses probe was launched in 1990 to study the Sun's polar regions. It first travelled to Jupiter, to "slingshot" into an orbit that would take it far above the plane of the ecliptic. Once Ulysses was in its scheduled orbit, it began observing the solar wind and magnetic field strength at high solar latitudes, finding that the solar wind from high latitudes was moving at about 750 km/s (slower than expected) and that there were large magnetic waves emerging from high latitudes that scattered galactic cosmic rays.

Elemental abundances in the photosphere are well known from spectroscopic studies, but the composition of the interior of the Sun is more poorly understood. A solar wind sample return mission, Genesis, was designed to allow astronomers to directly measure the composition of solar material.

== Religious aspects ==
Solar deities play a major role in many religions and mythologies. Worship of the Sun was central to civilisations such as the ancient Egyptians, the Inca of South America and the Aztecs of what is now Mexico. In Hinduism, the Sun is still considered a god, known as Surya (Sanskrit: सूर्य). Many ancient monuments were constructed with solar phenomena in mind; for example, stone megaliths mark the summer or winter solstice (for example in Nabta Playa, Egypt; Mnajdra, Malta; and Stonehenge, England); Newgrange, a prehistoric human-built mount in Ireland, was designed to detect the winter solstice; the pyramid of El Castillo at Chichén Itzá in Mexico is designed to cast shadows in the shape of serpents climbing the pyramid at the vernal and autumnal equinoxes.

The ancient Sumerians believed that the Sun was Utu, the god of justice and a helper-deity. Later, Utu was identified with the East Semitic god Shamash.

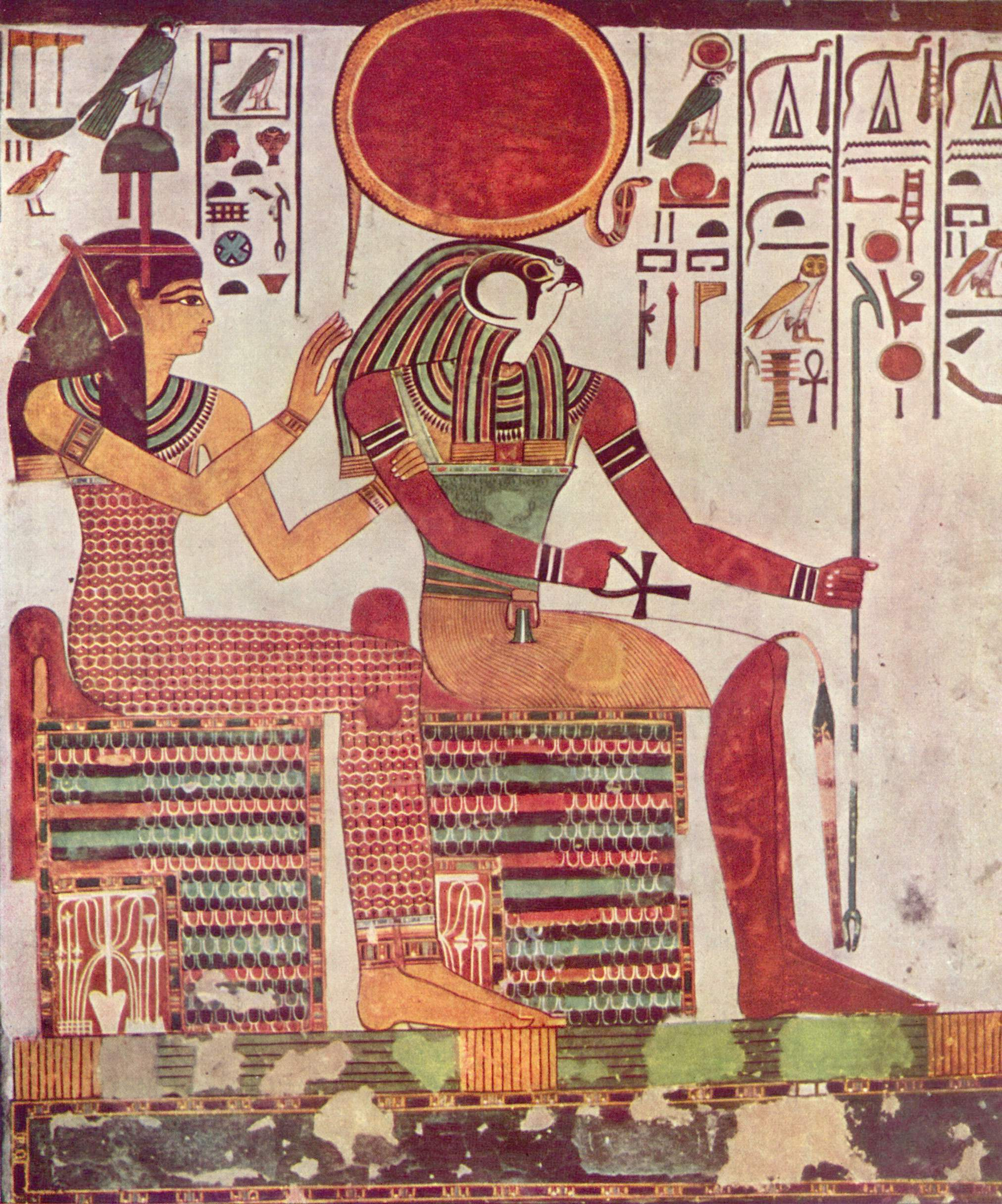
Ra from the tomb of Nefertari, 13th century BC

From at least the Fourth Dynasty of Ancient Egypt, the Sun was worshipped as the god Ra, portrayed as a falcon-headed divinity surmounted by the solar disk. In the New Empire period, the Sun became identified with the dung beetle. In the form of the sun disc Aten, the Sun had a brief resurgence during the Amarna Period when it became the preeminent, if not only, divinity for the Pharaoh Akhenaten. The Egyptians portrayed Ra as being carried across the sky in a solar barque, accompanied by lesser gods. To the Greeks, he was Helios, carried by a chariot drawn by fiery horses. From the reign of Elagabalus in the late Roman Empire the Sun's birthday was a holiday celebrated as Sol Invictus (literally 'Unconquered Sun') soon after the winter solstice. The Sun appears from Earth to revolve once a year along the ecliptic through the zodiac, and so Greek astronomers categorised it as one of the seven planets (from Greek planetes, 'wanderer'); the naming of the days of the weeks after the seven planets dates to the Roman era.

In Proto-Indo-European religion, the Sun was personified as the goddess *Seh_{2}ul. Derivatives of this goddess in Indo-European languages include Old Norse Sól, Sanskrit Surya, Gaulish Sulis, Lithuanian Saulė, and Slavic Solntse. In ancient Greek religion, the sun deity was the male god Helios, who was later syncretised with Apollo.

In ancient Rome, Sunday was the day of the sun god. In paganism, the Sun was a source of life. It was the centre of a popular cult among Romans, who would stand at dawn to catch the first rays of sunshine as they prayed. The celebration of the winter solstice (which influenced Christmas) was part of the Roman cult of Sol Invictus. It was adopted as the Sabbath day by Christians. The symbol of light was a pagan device adopted by Christians, perhaps the most important that did not come from Jewish traditions. Christian churches were built so that the congregation faced toward the sunrise. In the Bible, the Book of Malachi mentions the "Sun of Righteousness", which some Christians have interpreted as a reference to the Messiah (Christ).

Tonatiuh, the Aztec god of the sun, was closely associated with human sacrifice. The sun goddess Amaterasu is the most important deity in Shinto, and she is believed to be the ancestor of all Japanese emperors.

== See also ==
- Advanced Composition Explorer – NASA satellite of the Explorer program, at SE-L1 from 1997
- Analemma – Diagrammatic representation of Sun's position over a period of time
- Antisolar point – Point on the celestial sphere opposite Sun
- Faint young Sun paradox – Paradox concerning water on early Earth
- List of brightest stars
- List of nearest stars
- Midnight sun – Natural phenomenon when daylight lasts for a whole day
- Planets in astrology § Sun
- Solar telescope – Telescope used to observe the Sun
- Sun path – Arc-like path that the Sun appears to follow across the sky
- Sun-Earth Day – NASA and ESA joint educational program
- Sun in fiction
- Timeline of the far future – Scientific projections regarding the far future
