= Interstellar Probe (spacecraft) =

Proposed NASA space probe to travel 1000 AU from the Sun

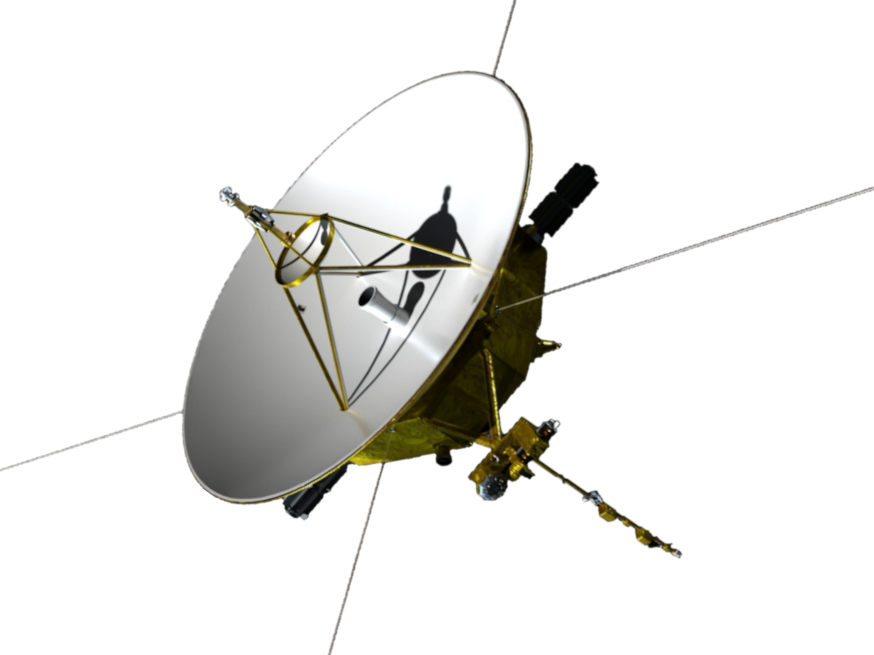
- Artist's rendering of the Interstellar Probe (plasma wave antennas extend far beyond portion shown)
- Mission type: Outer planetary, heliosphere, and interstellar medium exploration
- Operator: NASA / Johns Hopkins Applied Physics Laboratory
- Website: interstellarprobe.jhuapl.edu

Spacecraft properties
- Launch mass: 860 kg (1,900 lb)
- Power: 470 watts (at launch)

Start of mission
- Launch date: 2036
- Rocket: Space Launch System Block 2

Flyby of Jupiter
- Closest approach: 2037
- Distance: ~4 000 km

Interstellar Probe (ISP) is a proposed NASA space probe designed to explore and characterize the heliosphere and interstellar space. The study was originally proposed in 2018 by NASA for the Applied Physics Laboratory. It would have a baseline launch between 2036 and 2041. The probe would launch on a direct hyperbolic trajectory to encounter Jupiter after six to seven months, after which the probe would travel at a speed of about 6–7 astronomical units (900,000,000–1.05×10^{9} kilometres) per year, leaving the heliosphere after only 16 years.

The probe may have the opportunity to encounter minor planets on the way out, including Orcus and Quaoar, though such flybys would require specific launch dates. With next-generation radioisotope thermoelectric generators (RTGs), the mission would be designed to last for over 50 years after its launch, a similar feat reached by the Voyager 1 and 2 probes despite their intended 5-year lifetime. The mission has been called "Voyager on steroids".

== Mission background ==
Interstellar probes such as the Voyager program were made only with the intent to visit the outer planets, with the added interstellar mission as a mere bonus. Their lifetime had never been expected to be much longer than 12 years at the most, but the probes have lasted for upwards of four decades thus far. Both Voyagers left the heliosphere in the 2010s; Voyager 1 in 2012, and 2 in 2018.

While their readings have been valuable, many of their instruments have been shut off due to a lack of power in their RTGs. In addition, neither of them are headed toward the IBEX ribbon, a region discovered by the Interstellar Boundary Explorer where energetic neutral atoms (ENAs) seem to highly affect the heliosphere and are able to breach it at unprecedented rates.

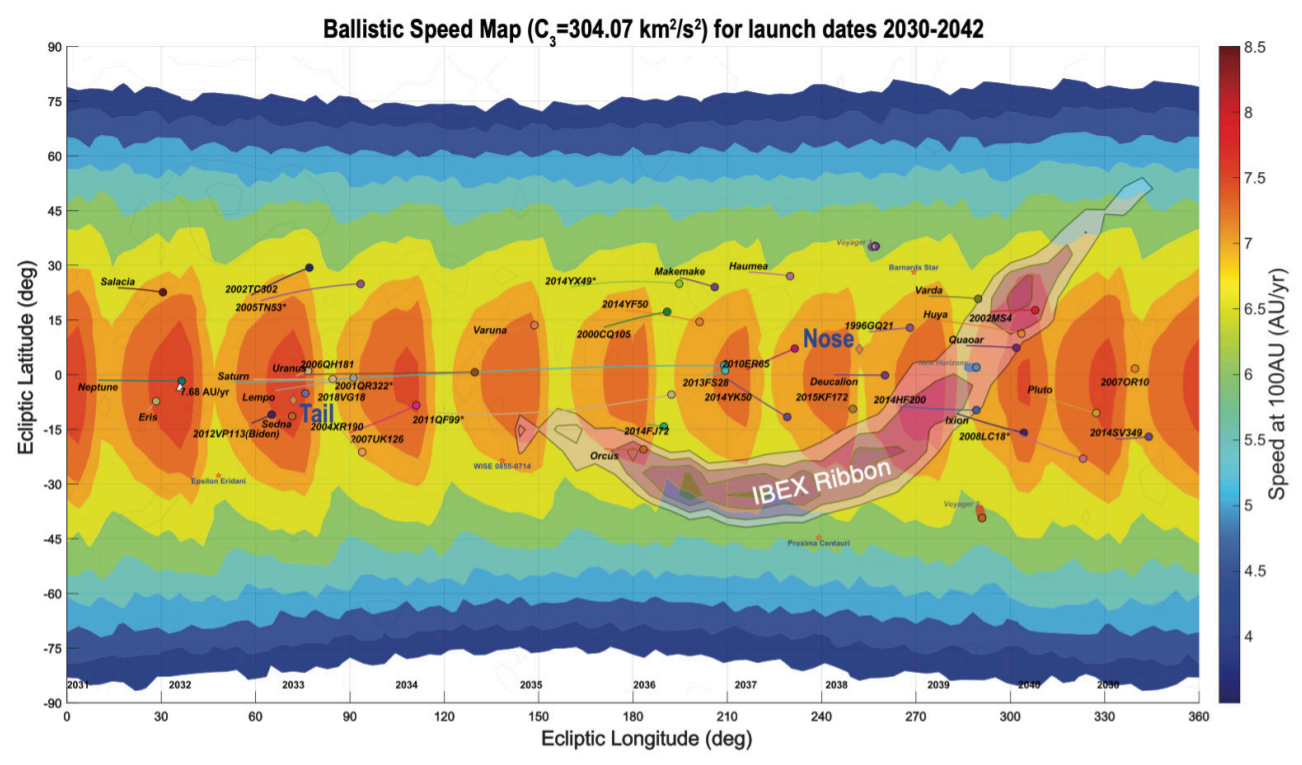
A graph displaying the IBEX ribbon juxtaposed with flyby speed and secondary targets

=== Primary science goals ===
The main goals of the Interstellar mission include characterizing the heliosphere as a habitable astrosphere by its global nature, its interactions with the Sun and the interstellar medium, and the nature of said interstellar medium. Similar goals may include viewing the Sun as a habitable exoplanetary system from beyond, with potential outbound giant or dwarf planet flybys along the way depending on chosen launch date, and understanding the universe from beyond the heliosphere.

== Scientific instruments ==
The probe would contain two differing scientific payloads, both weighing about 85–90 kg (187–198 lb). One would prioritize Lyman-alpha science, whereas the other would prioritize visible and infrared imaging of flyby targets. Payloads highlighted in red are exclusive to the baseline payload. Instruments in green are intended for the augmented flyby payload.

Instrument (abbr.)	Dimension, range, resolution	Heritage
Magnetometer (MAG)	Electromagnetic radiation: 0.01–100 nT	Magnetospheric Multiscale: DFG
Plasma Waves (PWS)	Plasma wave observations: ~1 Hz – 5 MHz, ≤0.7 μV/m at 3 kHz, ∆f/f ≤ 4%, ≤60 s full spectrum	Van Allen: EFW
Plasma Subsystem (PLS)	Ion spectrometer: < 3 eV/e to 20 keV/e	Parker Solar Probe: SWEAP, Span-A
Pick-Up Ions (PUI)	Ion counter: 0.5–78 keV/e	Ulysses: SWICS
Energetic Particles (EPS)	Ionization analysis: 20 keV – 20 MeV	Parker Solar Probe: IS☉IS, EPI-Lo
Cosmic Rays (CRS)	Cosmic ray analysis: H to Sn; 10 MeV/nuc – 1 GeV/nuc	Parker Solar Probe: IS☉IS, EPI-Hi
Interstellar Dust Analyzer (IDA)	Dust analysis: 10^{−19} to 10^{−14} g	Interstellar Mapping and Acceleration Probe: IDEX
Neutral Mass Spectrometer (NMS)	H, ^{3}He, ^{4}He, ^{14}N, ^{16}O, ^{20}Ne, ^{22}Ne, ^{36}Ar, ^{38}Ar, m/Δm ≥ 100	Jupiter Icy Moons Explorer: NMS
Energetic Neutral Atom Imager (ENA)	Images emission of energetic neutral atoms; ~1–100 keV H	Interstellar Mapping and Acceleration Probe: IMAP-Ultra
Lyman-Alpha Spectrograph (LYA)	Mapping solar wind interactions with interstellar medium: ±100 km/s Doppler range, <10 km/s resolution	MAVEN: IUVS
Visible-Near-IR (VIR)	Flyby imaging: 0.4–4 μm; ≥ 5 ch. ≤0.975 μm >240 ch. >0.975 μm	New Horizons: Ralph
Visible-IR Mapper (IRM)	Infrared mapping: 0.5–15 μm 30–100 μm	New Horizons: LEISA, CIBER-2

== Mission operations ==
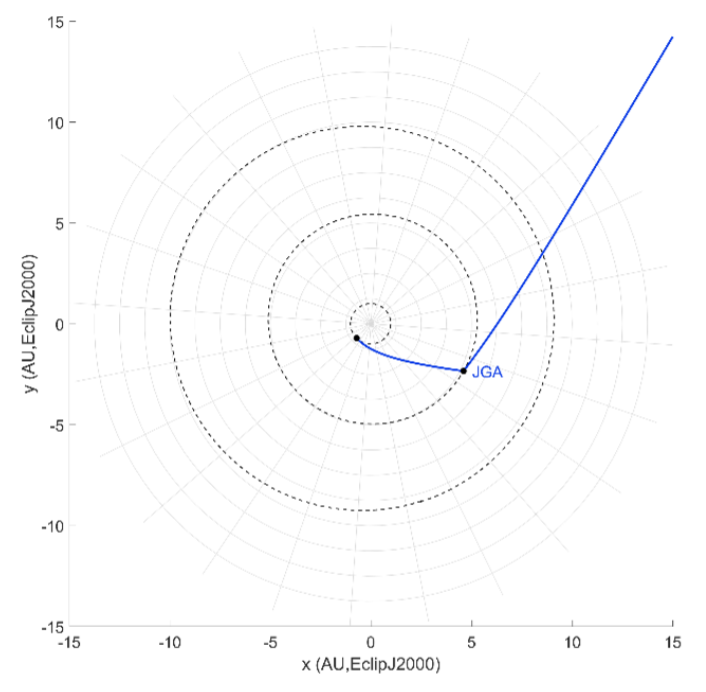
The baseline trajectory, using a passive gravity assist at Jupiter

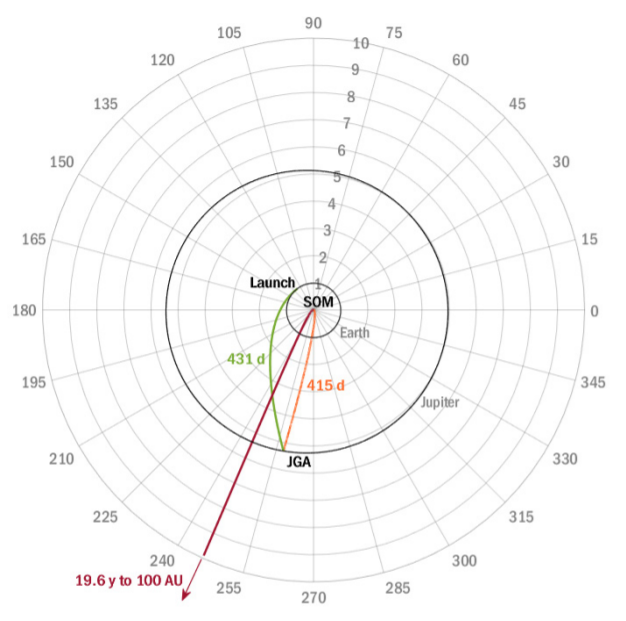
The Solar Oberth trajectory, using a brake at Jupiter for a burn at perihelion

=== Launch and trajectories ===
The baseline launch would be in 2036 using a Space Launch System in its Block 2 configuration, featuring an additional Centaur and Star 48BV booster. This launch would put the probe on a direct trajectory to Jupiter, and after a mere seven months the probe would make a gravity assist to speed out at about 95 km/s (about 216 000 mph). Alternative trajectories include bringing the Star 48 booster for a burn upon closest approach; one trajectory involving that burn at Jupiter with a slightly longer transit time, and another with about the same transit time, but passing ahead of Jupiter for a dive down near the Sun for an even faster escape trajectory.

Further trajectory options have been considered, including performing flybys of Saturn, Uranus, or Neptune depending on launch date to help characterize planetary formation and complement missing data sets, and dwarf planets to help characterize them as New Horizons did in 2015 with its flyby of Pluto.

== See also ==
- Shensuo, a proposed pair of probes by China made to explore the outer solar system and heliosphere.
- New Horizons, a Pluto flyby mission by NASA currently en route to explore the interstellar medium.
