= IBEX ribbon =

Arc of energetic neutral atoms at the heliosphere boundary

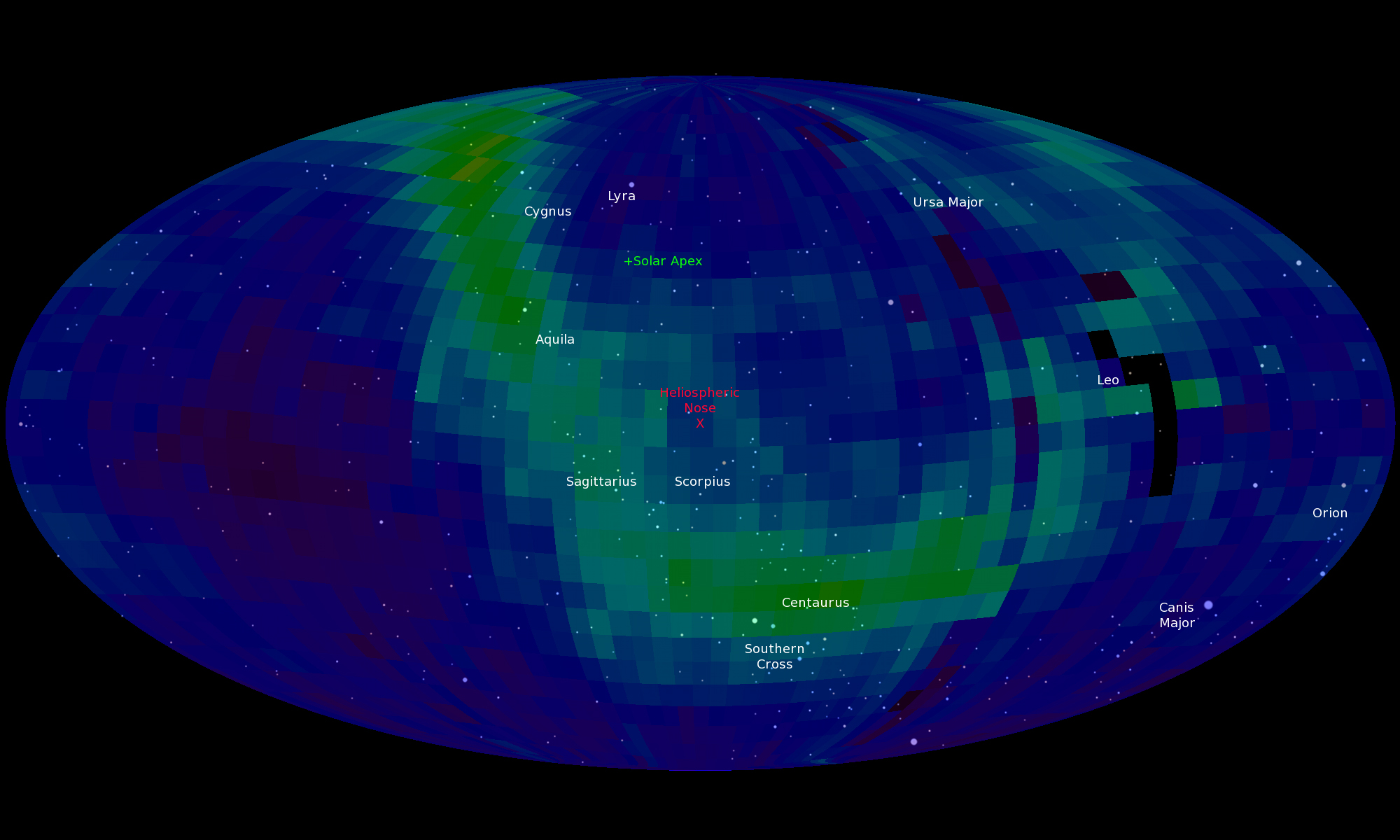
The IBEX ribbon on a 2009 all-sky map

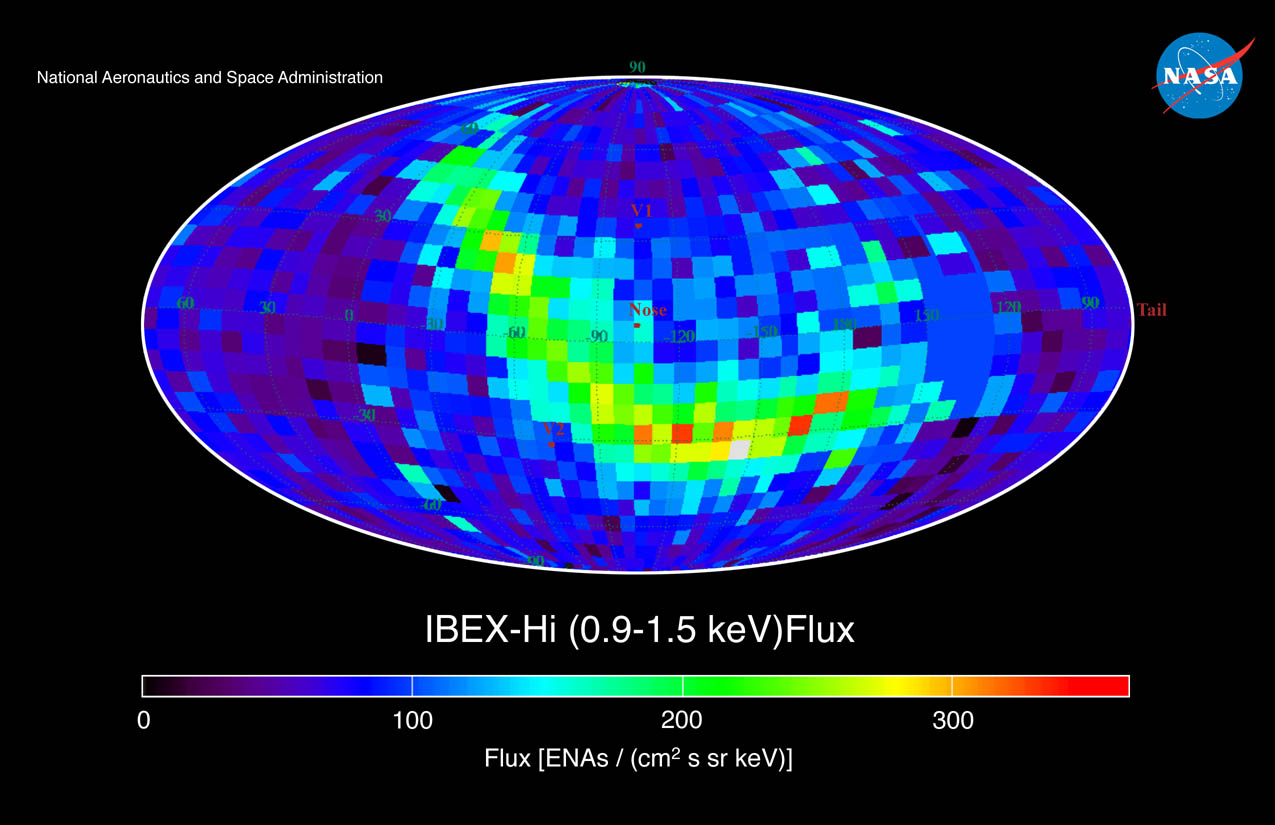
High-energy map of the heliosphere

The IBEX ribbon is a narrow, arc-shaped structure of enhanced energetic neutral atom (ENA) emissions discovered by NASA’s Interstellar Boundary Explorer (IBEX) mission in 2009. The ribbon is a significant feature at the boundary of the heliosphere, the region of space dominated by the Sun’s influence.

== Discovery ==
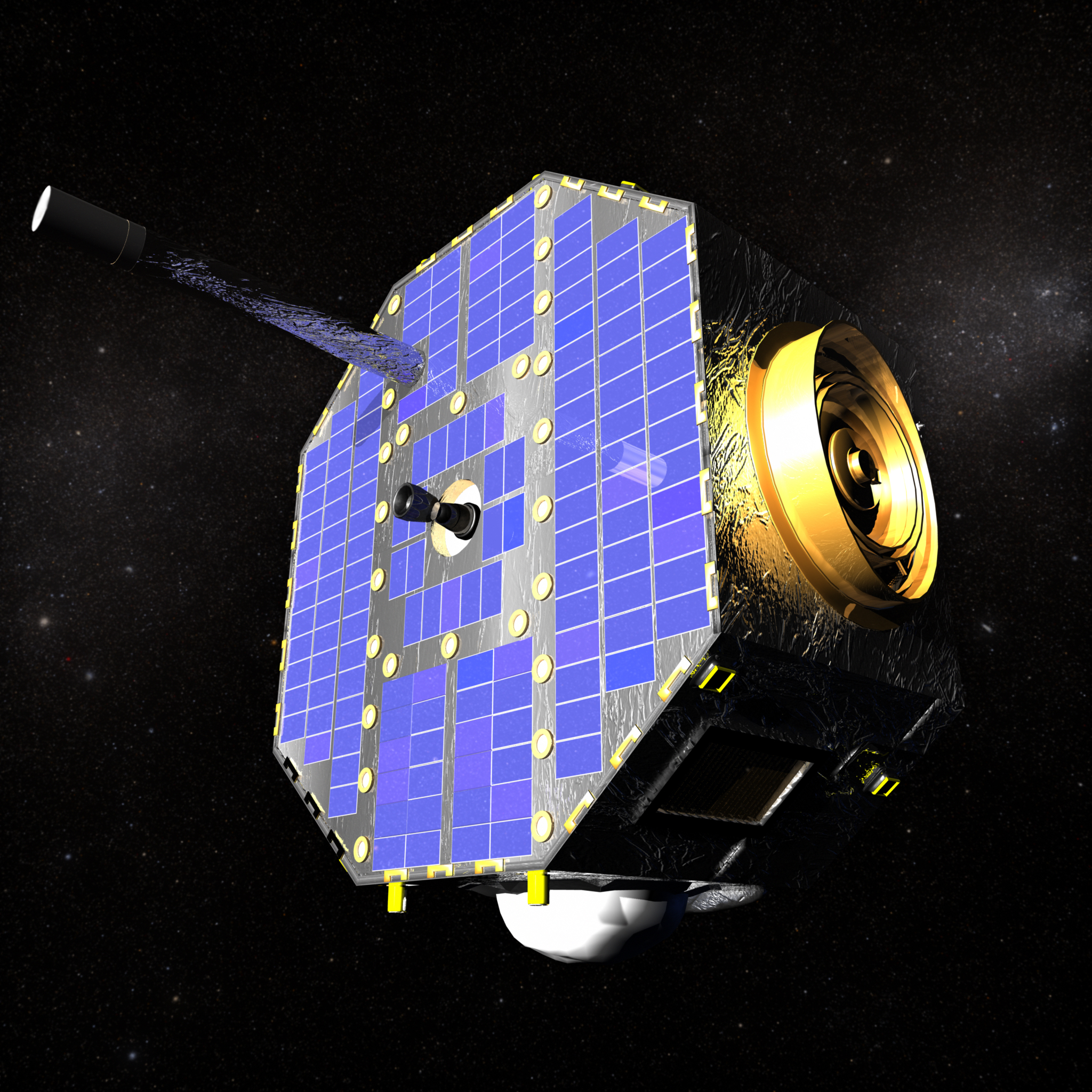
The IBEX spacecraft

The IBEX spacecraft, launched in 2008, was designed to map the flux of ENAs originating from the heliosphere’s boundary. In its first all-sky map, IBEX detected an unexpected, bright, and narrow structure of ENA emissions, now known as the IBEX ribbon. This feature was not predicted by prior models and indicated a complex interaction between the solar wind and the local interstellar magnetic field.

== Origin theories ==
Unsolved problem in astronomy
What is the nature of the IBEX ribbon?
More unsolved problems in astronomy

Multiple hypotheses have been proposed to explain the IBEX ribbon.

The first hypothesis, proposed by McComas et al. (2009) and Schwadron et al. (2009), suggests that the ribbon forms through a chain of charge-exchange processes. In this model, a ring distribution of pick-up ions in the local interstellar magnetic field leads to the production of ribbon ENAs, assuming inefficient isotropization.

A second theory by Schwadron & McComas (2013), proposes that the ribbon results from temporary containment of newly ionized atoms in a "retention" region in the local interstellar medium. These ions primarily originate from neutralized solar wind and pick-up ions from beyond the solar wind termination shock.

A third theory by Fahr et al. (2011) and Siewert et al. (2013), places the ion sources inside the heliosphere. Specifically, they propose that the ribbon ENAs come from pick-up ions related to adiabatically cooled anomalous cosmic rays upstream of the solar wind termination shock, as well as shock-accelerated pick-up ions beyond it.

A fourth theory by Grzedzielski et al. (2010) suggests that the ENAs are produced through charge exchange between neutral hydrogen atoms at the edge of the local interstellar cloud and hot protons in the Local Bubble.

A fifth theory by Fichtner et al. (2014) proposes that the ribbon is a consequence of inhomogeneities in the local interstellar medium itself, particularly related to the propagation of neutral density enhancements ("H-waves") along the interstellar magnetic field. This model suggests that when these density enhancements intersect with the heliopause, they create regions of increased ENA production that appear as the ribbon.

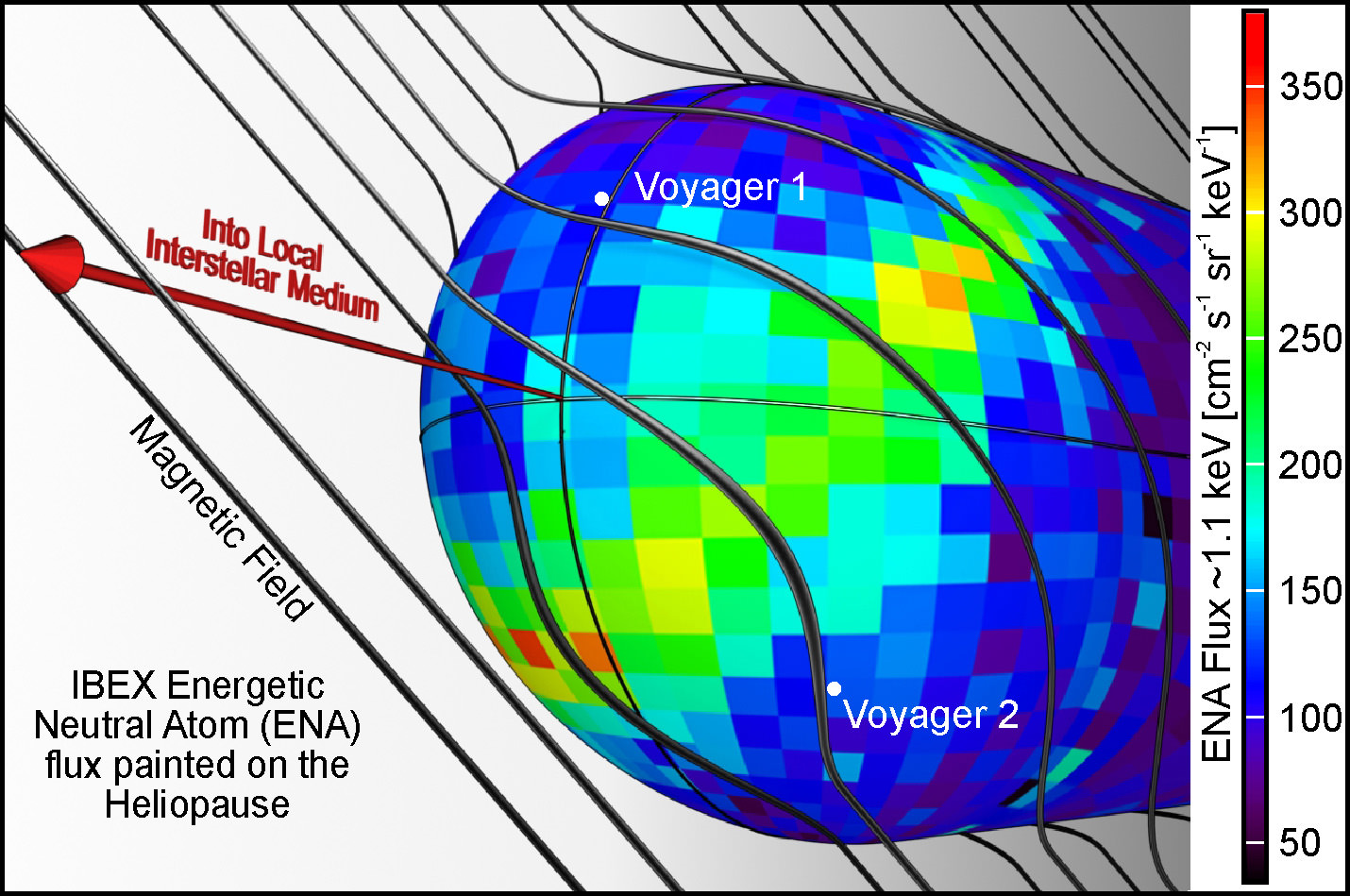
The ribbon of ENA emissions seen in the IBEX map.

As of 2014, none of the theories has gained universal acceptance, and each faces certain challenges in fully accounting for all the observed characteristics.

Schwadron and McComas (2019) explained the ribbon as being "created primarily from secondary solar wind atoms to a broadened and shifted structure (the broad ribbon or belt) created primarily from secondary suprathermal atoms in the heliosheath."

Xu and Liu (2023) propose that magnetohydrodynamic (MHD) turbulence in the very local interstellar medium plays a key role in forming the IBEX ribbon through a mechanism called mirror diffusion. In this model, compressible modes of MHD turbulence create magnetic mirrors that interact with pickup ions near regions where the magnetic field is perpendicular to the line of sight. These turbulent magnetic mirrors, rather than the mean magnetic field, dominate the mirroring effect due to their strong magnetic field gradients at small scales. The mirroring effect is most effective for pickup ions with pitch angles below a critical value.

The width of the IBEX ribbon (approximately 20° at 1 keV) is determined by two factors: the range of pitch angles where turbulent mirroring is effective and the wandering of magnetic field lines caused by Alfvénic modes. The authors found that for the ribbon structure to remain coherent across the sky, the injection scale of turbulence in the very local interstellar medium must be less than ~500 astronomical units. The model explains how pickup ions maintain their initial pitch angles through mirror diffusion, allowing them to return to the heliosphere as energetic neutral atoms after neutralization, creating the observed ribbon feature.

== Temporal variability ==
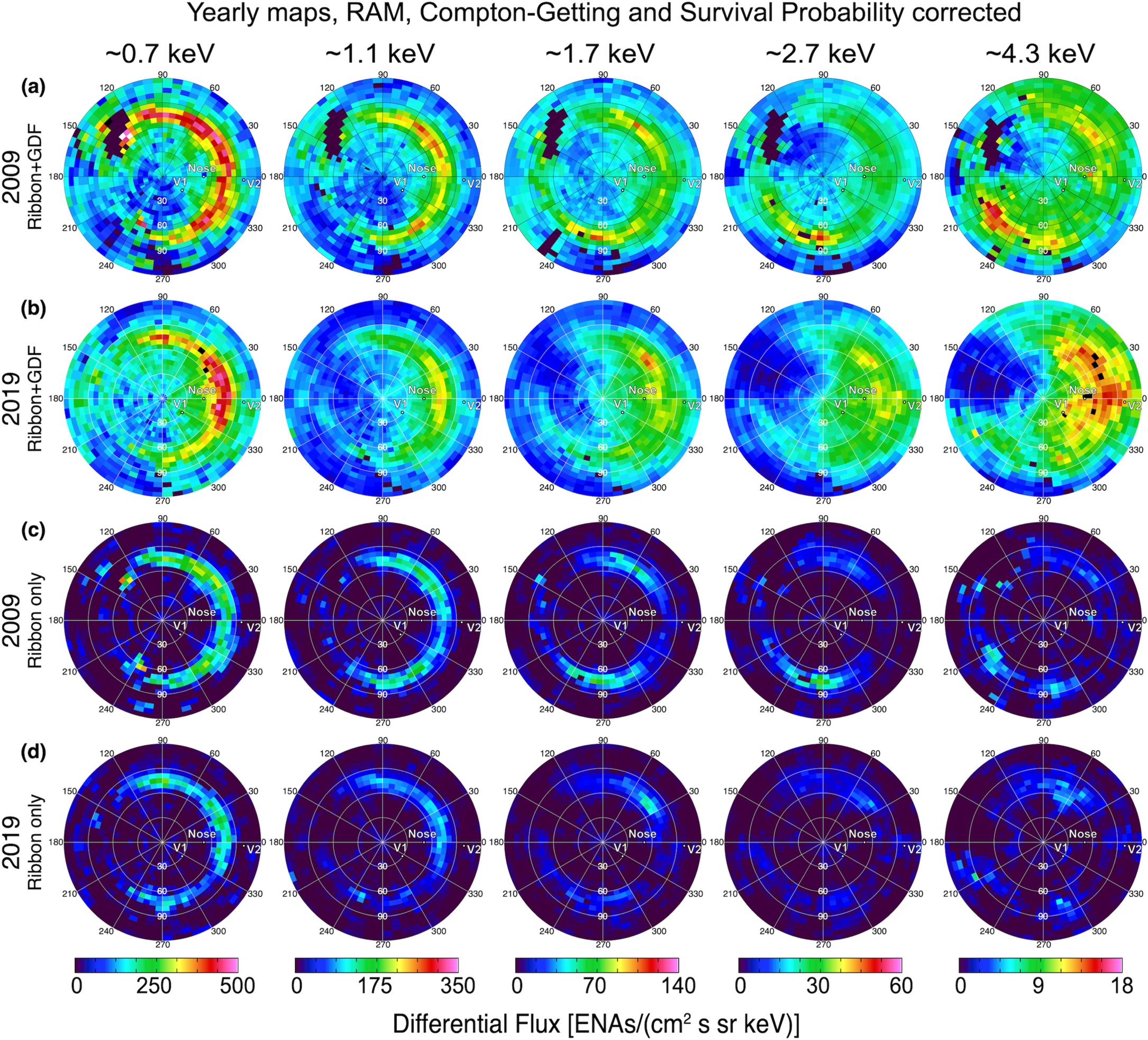
(a), (b) Ribbon-centered maps showing all-sky energetic neutral atom (ENA) fluxes at five IBEX-Hi energies for 2009 and 2019. (c), (d) Separated Ribbon-only maps for 2009 processed using maps from (a), (b) and the Ribbon separation method of Swaczyna et al. (2022). Labels mark the directions of upwind interstellar inflow (nose), and the Voyager spacecraft (V1 and V2).

IBEX observations over more than a decade indicate that the intensity and structure of the ribbon evolve over the solar cycle. The ribbon and globally distributed flux (GDF) both respond to solar cycle changes, but with different time delays. The GDF shows a smaller temporal latency than the ribbon by a few years.

A study comparing IBEX observations from 2009 and 2019 revealed key temporal changes in the ribbon structure. For energies below 1.7 keV, the ribbon's intensity recovered near the nose direction and up to 25° southward, but not at mid and high ecliptic latitudes, which fell in similar phases of solar cycles 23 and 24. The ribbon's width showed significant variability depending on the viewing angle around the map center, with different patterns between 2009 and 2019. Despite these changes, circularity analysis indicated that the ribbon's radius remained statistically consistent between the two periods. The partial recovery aligned with models suggesting the heliosphere's closest point lies southward of the nose region. The variable width patterns potentially indicated small-scale processes occurring within the ribbon's source region.

At low latitudes where solar wind speeds average below 500 km/s, the majority of observed energetic neutral atoms have energies below 2 keV, explaining why significant intensity changes occurred primarily at these lower energies. The recovery was first observed in the southern regions where the heliosphere's boundaries are closest to the Sun, consistent with models predicting different response times based on the distance traveled by the particles.

== Connection to the interstellar magnetic field ==
The 2013 study found the ribbon to be "extraordinarily circular" with its center at ecliptic coordinates (219.2° ± 1.3°, 39.9° ± 2.3°). This center lies 50° from the heliospheric nose direction and is thought to align with the local interstellar magnetic field direction. The ribbon demonstrated exceptional spatial coherence across all observed energies (0.7-4.3 keV), with a spatial coherence parameter of δC ≤ 0.014, suggesting it forms in a region where the interstellar magnetic field structure is highly uniform over large distances.

The analysis revealed subtle structural details: a slight systematic elongation of the ribbon (eccentricity ~0.3) generally perpendicular to the vector between the ribbon center and heliospheric nose, and an asymmetric intensity profile skewed toward the ribbon's interior. At higher energies (4.3 keV), the ribbon appeared slightly larger and displaced relative to lower energies. These characteristics provide key constraints for models of the ribbon's formation and its relationship to the broader heliosphere-interstellar medium interaction, though the exact physical mechanisms involved are still uncertain.

== Future observations ==
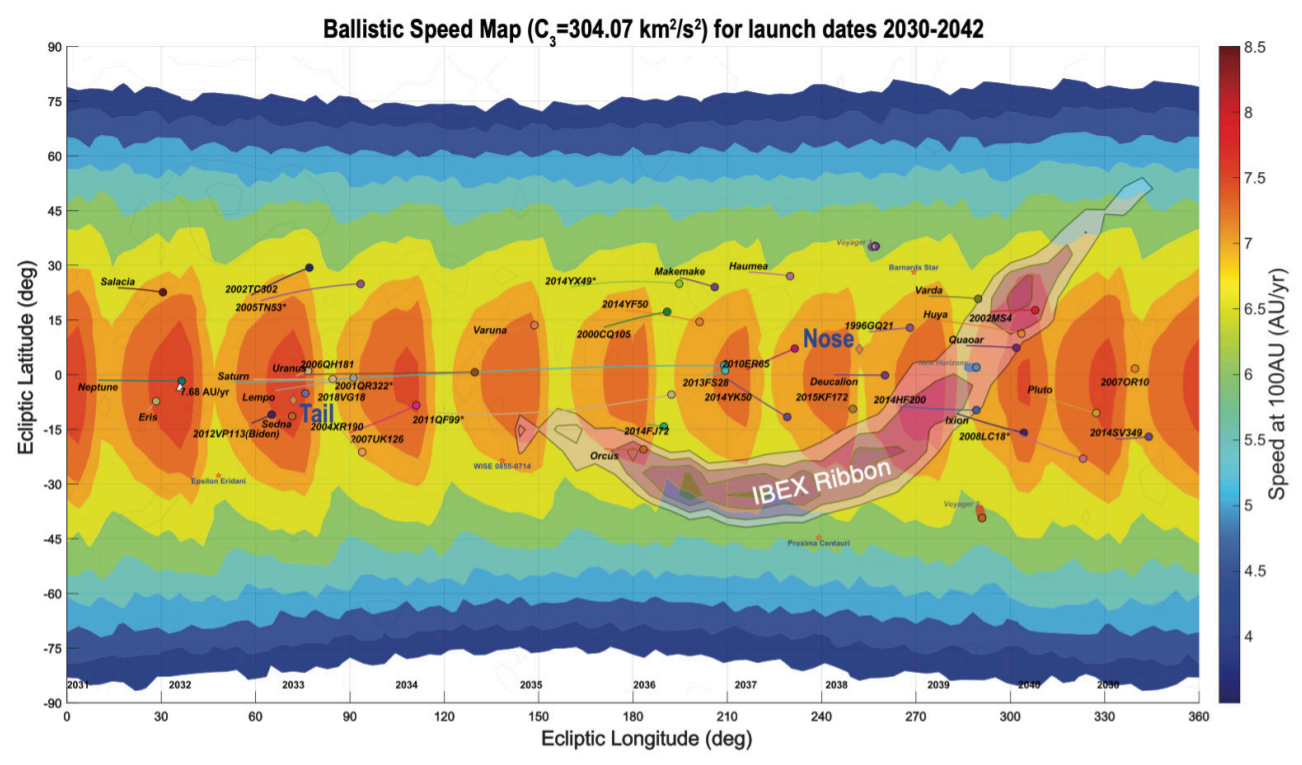
A juxtapositive graph of Interstellar Probe's potential flyby speed after Jupiter, year of flyby, potential flyby targets, and the IBEX ribbon.

With IBEX continuing its mission, future studies aim to compare its results with data from NASA’s Interstellar Mapping and Acceleration Probe (IMAP), which is expected to provide higher-resolution ENA measurements. IMAP launched September 24, 2025.
