= Merav Opher =

Space physicist

- Education: University of São Paulo
- Scientific career
- Fields: Astrophysics, plasma physics
- Thesis: Efeitos de plasma no universo primordial (1998)

Merav Opher is a professor of astronomy at Boston University known for her work on the heliosphere, the cocoon formed by the wind emanated from the Sun as it travels in the Galaxy. In 2021 she was named a William Bentinck-Smith Fellow at the Harvard Radcliffe Institute.

== Education and career ==
Opher was born in Israel and lived there until 1978 when she moved to Brazil with her parents. In 1992 and 1998, Opher received her B.S. in physics and her Ph.D. in physics and astronomy from the University of São Paulo. Following her Ph.D., Opher was a postdoctoral investigator at the University of California, Los Angeles from 1999 until 2001. She was a Caltech Scholar at NASA's Jet Propulsion Laboratory and at University of Michigan from 2001-2004. She was on the faculty of George Mason University from 2005 until 2010, at which point she moved to Boston University, where she was promoted to professor in 2020.

Opher is the director of the SHIELD DRIVE Science Center at Boston University, a project funded by NASA that will study the shape of the heliosphere. She has served on the Space Studies Board at the National Academy of Sciences which evaluated the progress of space and solar physics.

== Research ==
Her research interests include computational and theoretical plasma physics in space and astrophysics, interaction of the Solar System with the interstellar medium, solar wind, and shocks in the lower corona, T-Tauri and Solar-Like Stars. In 2001, Opher began work on the heliosphere while she was a postdoctoral student at the Jet Propulsion lab. Her researcher focuses on how the solar wind shapes the heliosphere, the protective atmospheric shield between Earth and the rest of the galaxy, where she has shown the shape of the heliosphere is similar to a croissant and not a comet with a tail as previously thought. Opher's 2020 paper expanding on the crescent shape of the heliosphere was published in Nature Astronomy, featured on the cover of the July 2020 issue, and covered by the media. In 2021, Opher's research revealed that the stability of the heliosphere originates from the neutral hydrogen particles that interact with the heliosphere.

Opher has written in The Hill about the dangers of space tourism for people where she describes the radiation coming through space and the need to better understand how the heliosphere filters this radiation before people can travel safely to other planets.

As of 2021, Opher's research has been cited more than 4400 times and she has an h-index of 37.

== Honors and awards ==
In 2008, Opher received an NSF Young Investigator Award, a Presidential Early Career Award for Scientists and Engineers, and she was named a Kavli Fellow by the National Academy of Sciences. In 2021, Opher was named a William Bentinck-Smith Fellow at the Harvard Radcliffe Institute.

== Selected publications ==
- Opher, M.; Bibi, F. Alouani; Toth, G.; Richardson, J. D.; Izmodenov, V. V.; Gombosi, T. I. (2009). "A strong, highly-tilted interstellar magnetic field near the Solar System". Nature. 462 (7276): 1036–1038. Bibcode:2009Natur.462.1036O. doi:10.1038/nature08567. ISSN 0028-0836. PMID 20033043. S2CID 205218936.
- Opher, Merav; Stone, Edward C.; Liewer, Paulett C. (2006-03-20). "The Effects of a Local Interstellar Magnetic Field on Voyager 1 and 2 Observations". The Astrophysical Journal. 640 (1): L71–L74. arXiv:astro-ph/0603318. Bibcode:2006ApJ...640L..71O. doi:10.1086/503251. ISSN 0004-637X. S2CID 16029184.
- Opher, Merav; Silva, Luis O.; Dauger, Dean E.; Decyk, Viktor K.; Dawson, John M. (2001-05-01). "Nuclear reaction rates and energy in stellar plasmas: The effect of highly damped modes". Physics of Plasmas. 8 (5): 2454–2460. arXiv:astro-ph/0105153. Bibcode:2001PhPl....8.2454O. doi:10.1063/1.1362533. ISSN 1070-664X. S2CID 18625282.
- Tóth, Gábor; van der Holst, Bart; Sokolov, Igor V.; De Zeeuw, Darren L.; Gombosi, Tamas I.; Fang, Fang; Manchester, Ward B.; Meng, Xing; Najib, Dalal; Powell, Kenneth G.; Stout, Quentin F. (2012-02-01). "Adaptive numerical algorithms in space weather modeling". Journal of Computational Physics. Special Issue: Computational Plasma Physics. 231 (3): 870–903. Bibcode:2012JCoPh.231..870T. doi:10.1016/j.jcp.2011.02.006. hdl:2060/20110005631. ISSN 0021-9991.
