= David J. McComas =

David John McComas
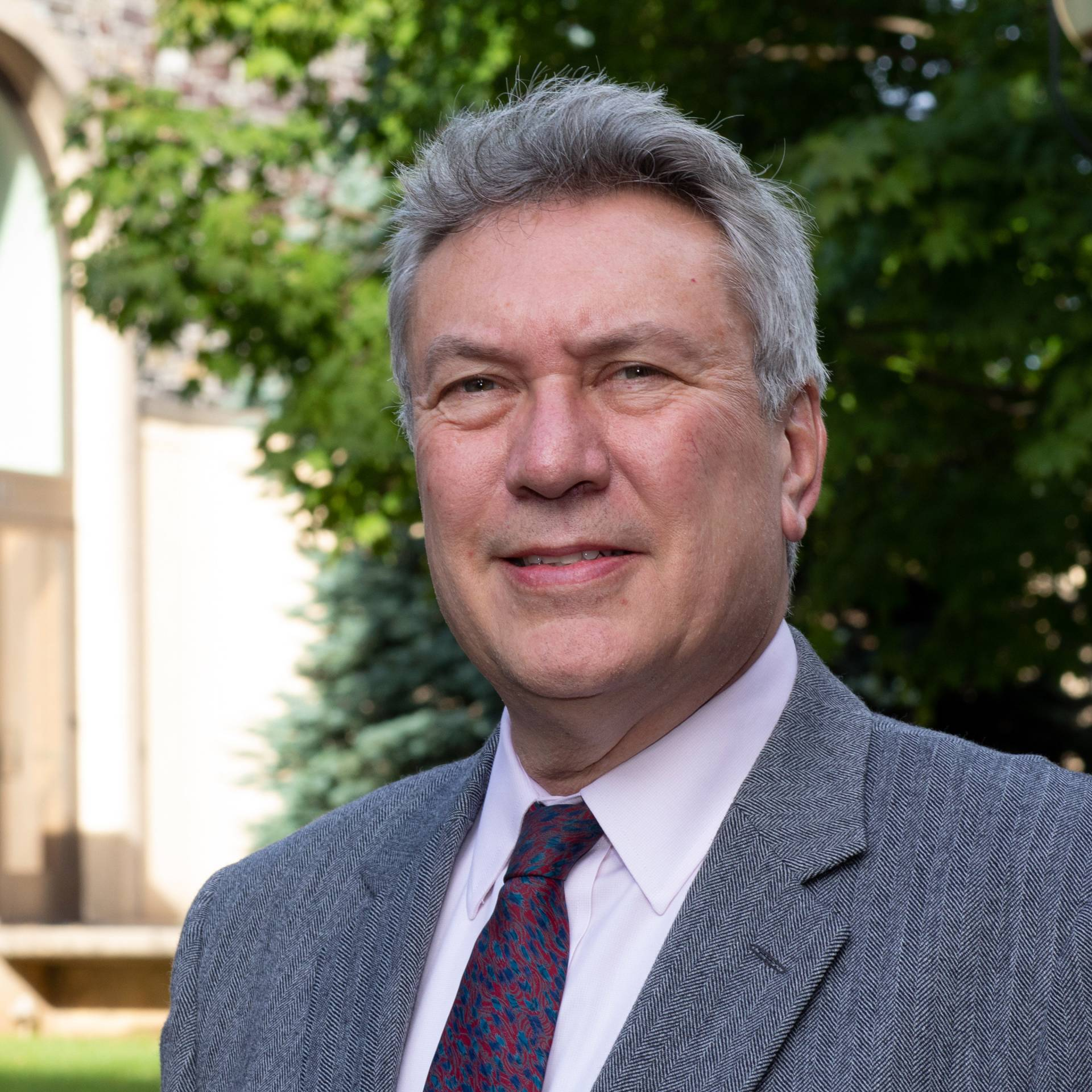
- Born: May 22, 1958 (age 68); Milwaukee, Wisconsin, U.S.
- Education: Massachusetts Institute of Technology (B.S.) University of California, Los Angeles (M.S., Ph.D.)
- Scientific career
- Thesis: Field Reversing Magnetotail Current Sheets: Earth, Venus, and Comet Giacobini-Zinner (1986)
- Doctoral advisor: Christopher T. Russell

David John McComas (born May 22, 1958) is an American space physicist, Professor of Astrophysical Sciences, and leads the Space Physics at Princeton Group at Princeton University. He was the Princeton University Vice President for the Princeton Plasma Physics Lab (PPPL) from 2016 - 2024 and previously Assistant Vice President for Space Science and Engineering at the Southwest Research Institute, Adjoint Professor of Physics at the University of Texas at San Antonio (UTSA), and was the founding director of the Center for Space Science and Exploration at Los Alamos National Laboratory. He is noted for his accomplishments in experimental space plasma physics, including leading instruments and missions to study the heliosphere and solar wind: IMAP, IBEX, TWINS, Ulysses/SWOOPS, ACE/SWEPAM, and Parker Solar Probe. He received the National Academy of Science's 2023 Arctowski Medal, European Geosciences Union 2022 Hannes Alfven Medal, SCOSTEP 2022 Distinguished Scientist Award, a NASA Exceptional Public Service Medal in 2015, the 2014 COSPAR Space Science Award, and the American Geophysical Union 1993 Macelwane Medal.

== Biography ==
McComas was born in Milwaukee, Wisconsin. His father, Harold McComas, was a World War II Veteran, who went to college and law school through the GI Bill. His mother, Hazelyn McComas, nee Melconian, was the descendant of Armenian/Lebanese refugees who fled the genocide from Beirut to Ellis Island. McComas is severely dyslexic, and didn’t start to learn how to read until the 4th grade. He discussed his dyslexia in childhood and how it led him to space science in a 2014 talk entitled “A Personal Journey from “Slow” to the interstellar Frontier.” McComas received his undergraduate degree in physics from Massachusetts Institute of Technology in 1980, and his M.S. and Ph.D. in Geophysics and Space Physics from University of California, Los Angeles in 1985 and 1986. He began his space physics career in 1980 with early development work on the SWOOPS instrument at the Los Alamos National Laboratory for the NASA / ESA Ulysses joint space mission. He moved to SwRI, in San Antonio, Texas, in 2000 and Princeton University in 2016.

McComas holds seven patents and is author of over 800 scientific and technical papers in the refereed literature, spanning topics in heliospheric, magnetospheric, solar, and planetary science as well as space instrumentation and mission development. Together these have garnered over 50,000 citations.

== Space missions ==
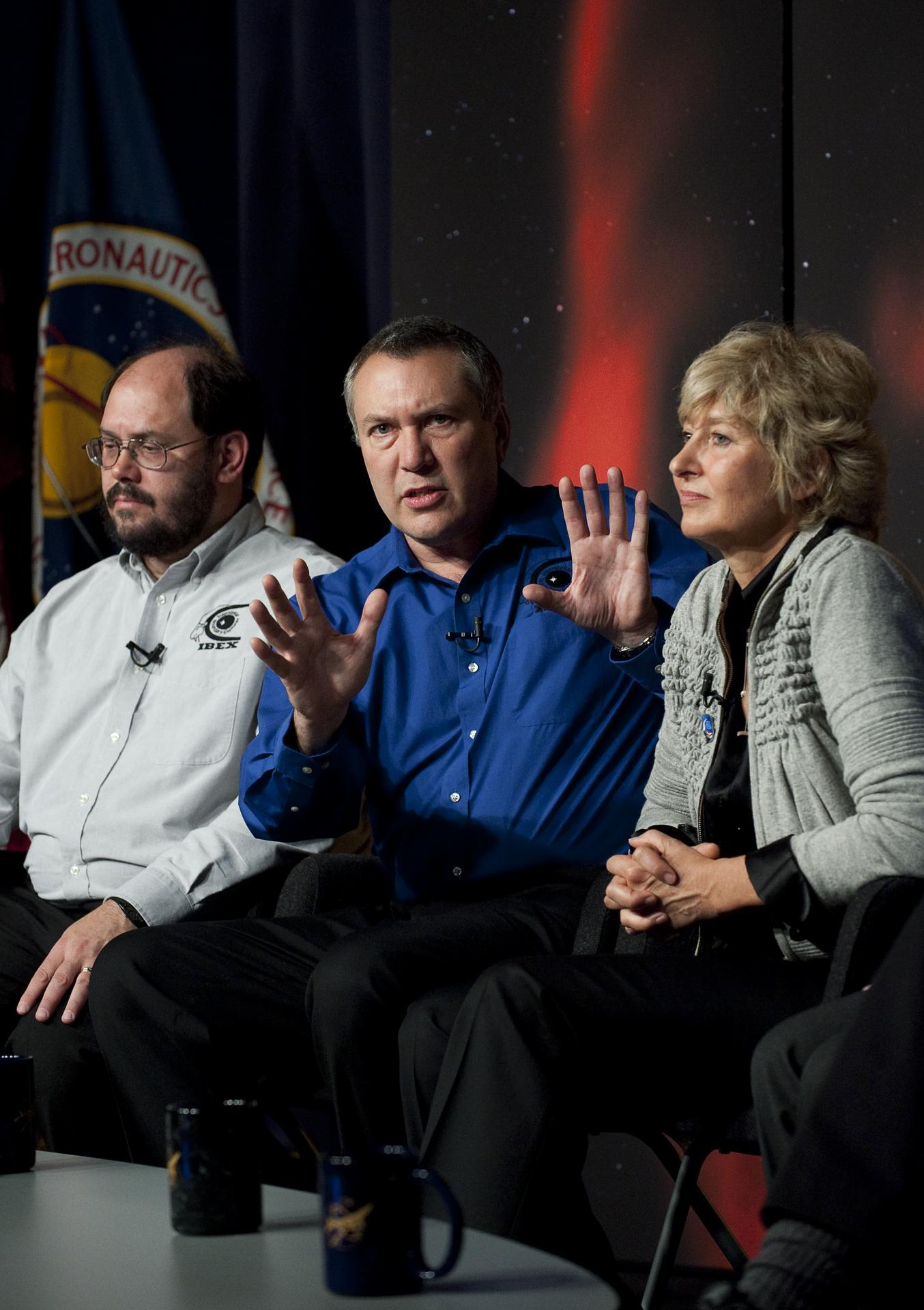
McComas at IBEX Sky Map Press Conference, 2009

McComas is Principal Investigator of NASA's Interstellar Mapping and Acceleration Probe (IMAP), Interstellar Boundary Explorer (IBEX) and TWINS (Two Wide-Angle Imaging Neutral-atom Spectrometers) missions, as well as the Parker Solar Probe – Integrated Science Investigation of the Sun instrument suite (ISOIS), and the Ulysses Solar Wind Plasma Investigation (SWOOPS) instrument. He is lead co-investigator for the Advanced Composition Explorer (ACE) Solar Wind Electron, Proton, Alpha Monitor (SWEPAM), and Solar Wind Around Pluto (SWAP) instrument on New Horizons.

McComas is also co-investigator on the JUNO mission and led the design and development of the Jovian Auroral Distribution Experiment (JADE) Instrument and is co-investigator on the Magnetospheric Multiscale Mission (MMS), Cassini-Huygens Plasma Spectrometer (CAPS), GENESIS discovery mission, POLAR Thermal Ion Dynamics Experiment (TIDE), and IMAGE Midsized Explorer. At Los Alamos he was also principal investigator for a series of Magnetospheric Plasma Analyzers (MPAs) in geosynchronous orbit.

McComas received the 2022 Hannes Alfvén Medal; his main contributions are listed in the nomination:

Seminal contributions and discoveries include the three-dimensional structure of the solar wind over the solar cycle, an explanation of the Voyager paradox of absence of anomalous cosmic rays at the edge of our heliosphere via particle acceleration at a blunt termination shock, diverse plasma populations and structures down Jupiter’s deep magnetotail, or the IBEX “ribbon” of enhanced energetic neutral atom emissions from the outer heliosphere. Other world-renowned contributions of McComas to space science are the characterisation of the temporal variations and evolution of the outer heliosphere, a warmer local interstellar medium than previously believed, or the first direct observations of interstellar pickup ions in the solar wind from 22 to 38 astronomical units.

== Boards and advisory committees ==
McComas serves on the PPPL Board of Directors and Brookhaven National Laboratory (BNL) Science Associates Board of Directors He recently served on the National Academies' Space Science Board (SSB) and Committee on Increasing Diversity and Inclusion in the Leadership of Competed Space Missions. He was previously a member of the NASA Advisory Council (NAC 2013 - 2015) and served and then chaired the NAC Science Committee (2010 - 2015). He chaired NASA's Solar Probe Science and Technology Definition Team (2003 -2008), NASA's Sun-Earth Connections Advisory Subcommittee (SECAS) 2000–2003, and J. Robert Oppenheimer Memorial Committee (1997-1999).

McComas also previously served on the advisory committee for the Scobee Education Center at San Antonio College and on the board of directors of the J. Robert Oppenheimer Memorial Committee and of the Dyslexic Advantage, a non-profit focused on the strengths of the dyslexic mind.

== Awards and honors ==
- Recipient of the Arctowski Medal for pioneering contributions to experimental space physics (2023)
- Recipient of the EGU Hannes Alfvén Medal for plasma physics research (2022)
- Recipient of the Scientific Committee on Solar-Terrestrial Physics Distinguished Scientist Award (2022)
- Recipient of the NASA Exceptional Public Service Medal (2015)
- Recipient of the 2014 COSPAR Space Science Award
- Recipient of the 2012 Adler Planetarium Outstanding Science Education Partner of the Year Award
- Fellow (2010) American Physical Society
- Fellow (2007) American Association for the Advancement of Science
- Recipient of the 1993 American Geophysical Union James B. Macelwane Medal
- Fellow (1993) American Geophysical Union
- Recipient of 19 NASA Group Achievement Awards
- Asteroid 172090 Davidmccomas, named after him in 2018
