= Anomalous cosmic ray =

Cosmic rays inside the heliosphere

Anomalous cosmic rays (ACRs), or the anomalous component of cosmic rays, are energetic ions of interstellar origin that are observed inside the heliosphere. Interstellar neutral atoms drift inward, become ionized by solar ultraviolet photons, electron impact, or charge exchange, are picked up by the solar wind, and are then accelerated—mainly near the solar-wind termination shock and throughout the heliosheath—by diffusive shock acceleration and related processes.

== Discovery and name ==
ACRs were first discovered as "an unusual enhancement in the low-energy end of the helium spectrum at 1 au over the solar quiet periods of May–July 1972, which cannot be explained by conventional solar modulation theory", by Garcia-Munoz, Mason & Simpson.

The particles were called "anomalous" because their presence and characteristics didn't fit with the existing understanding of cosmic rays at the time. The enhancement was particularly notable in that "the GCR [galactic cosmic rays] intensity did not decrease with decreasing energy, as was expected based on our understanding that low-energy GCRs were unable to reach 1 AU due to their interaction with the solar wind". Giacalone et al. (2022) argue that "anomalous cosmic rays" is a confusing and not descriptive name, and propose to use "Heliospheric Energetic Particles" instead of it.

Shortly after the discovery, in 1974, Fisk, Kozlovsky, and Ramaty proposed the theoretical explanation for ACRs' origin. They suggested that "these particles ultimately originate from interstellar neutral atoms that drift into the heliosphere", which then become ionized and accelerated to cosmic ray energies.

== Origin and acceleration ==
In the standard picture, pickup ions created from interstellar neutrals are accelerated at the termination shock; numerical models and transport calculations reproduce key ACR properties under this assumption. Voyager measurements and global modeling indicate that acceleration and transport continue in the heliosheath; analyses have proposed a heliosheath "reservoir" for ACRs. Recent work also discusses pre-acceleration of pickup ions in the inner heliosphere.

Solar modulation theory explains how the intensity of cosmic rays changes as they travel through the heliosphere, influenced by the solar wind and magnetic field. Solar modulation is a quasiperiodical change in cosmic rays intensity caused by 11- and 22-year cycles of solar activity. ACRs are also modulated by the Sun; the mechanism of transport and modulation is complex, as described by Rankin et al.:

the transport of cosmic rays throughout the heliosphere is highly complex and involves an interplay of many different physical phenomena, including (i) the outwardly expanding solar wind which contributes to adiabatic energy losses and convection, (ii) irregularities in the magnetic field which lead to diffusion, and (iii) the large-scale heliospheric magnetic field that is responsible for gradient and curvature drifts.

Acceleration of ACRs can be approximated using the Parker transport equation.

In 2002, Schwadron et al. proposed the existence of an outer source of ACRs: "sputtered atoms (subsequently ionized and picked up by the solar wind) from small grains generated via collisions of objects in the Edgeworth-Kuiper Belt".

== Composition and effects on the heliosphere ==
ACRs are dominated by species most abundant of the neutral gas in the very local interstellar medium. Measurements show enhanced contributions from hydrogen, helium, nitrogen, oxygen, neon, and argon, with energies of ~5 to ~50 MeV/nucleon. "Unusual overabundance" in the range of MeV/n was observed for He, N, O and Fe. These particles start out as neutral atoms in interstellar space and are transported into the heliosphere by the incoming flow of the interstellar wind. Some particles are then ionized near the Sun, gain energy from the solar wind's electric field, and are carried outward with the ~1 keV solar wind flow. A small fraction of these pickup ions undergo acceleration to energies of tens to hundreds of MeV within a ~year, "producing "anomalous" enhancements in the low-energy end of cosmic ray spectra".

ACR intensities and spectra vary with heliospheric conditions and the solar cycle. Modeling and observations of oxygen and helium show solar-cycle–dependent gradients and spectral changes, including differences between consecutive solar minima.

Coupled MHD–particle simulations that include an ACR pressure component find that ACRs can modify large-scale solar-wind structures in the outer heliosphere, smoothing shock fronts and reducing shock speeds.

== Observations ==
ACRs were measured using multiple spacecraft. In 1990, Cummings et al. used data collected by Pioneer 10, Pioneer 11, Voyager 1, Voyager 2, and the Interplanetary Monitoring Platform-8 (IMP-8) to derive gradients for oxygen and helium. ACR were also measured by WIND, Advanced Composition Explorer, Helios, Ulysses, SOHO, and other spacecraft.

Recently, Parker Solar Probe measured ACRs at 1 au to 0.05 au from the Sun. Solar Orbiter measured ACRs from 1 to 0.3 au.

== Voyager paradox ==
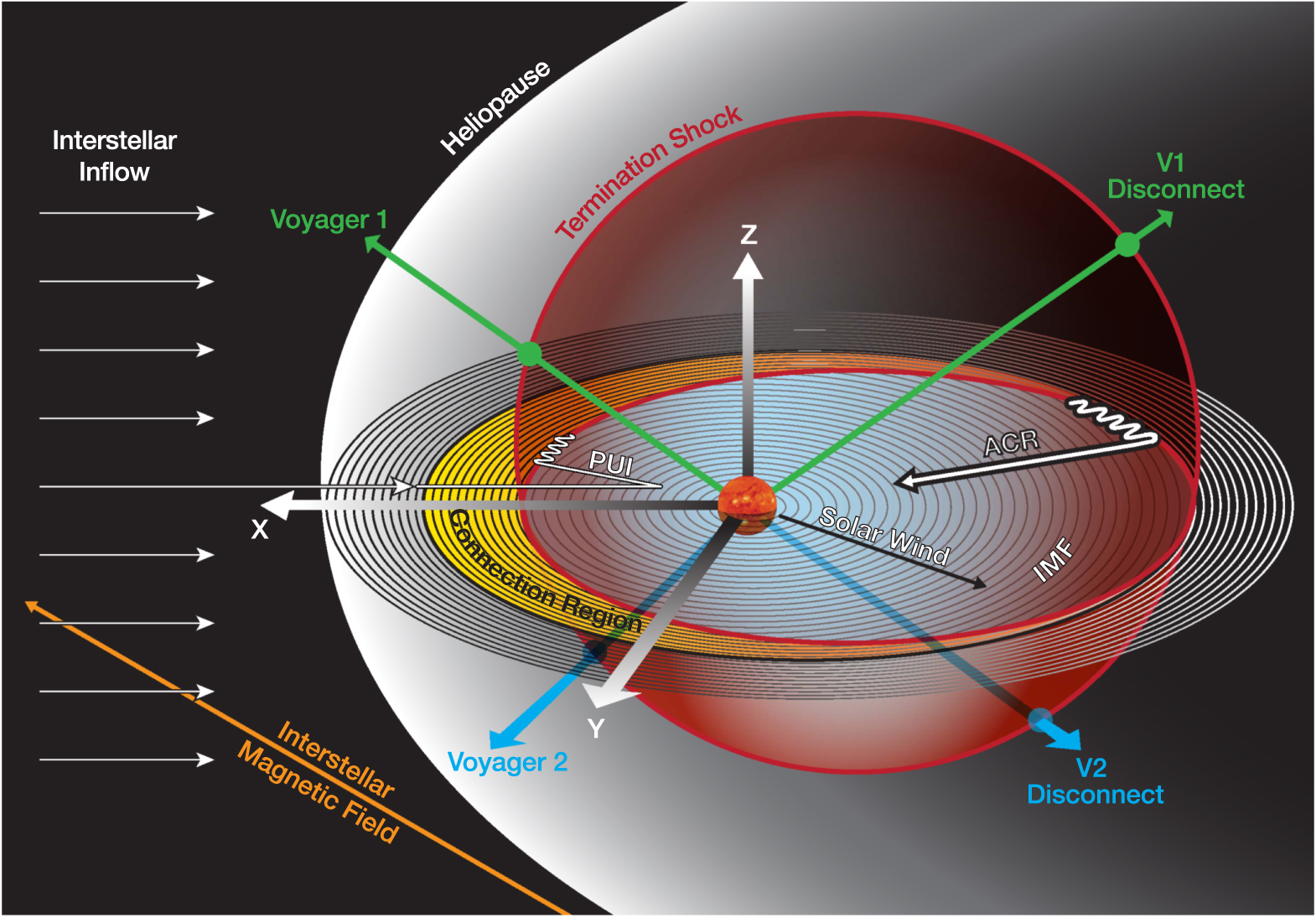
Schematic representation of the three-dimensional heliosphere. Inside the TS, the solar wind expands radially in all directions, wrapping up the interplanetary magnetic field into Archimedean spirals (black/white).

Voyager 1 and Voyager 2 observed the termination shock at 94.0 AU (2004) and 83.7 AU (2007). In 2012, Voyager 1 crossed the heliopause at 121.6 au; in 2018, Voyager 2 crossed it at ~119 au. Voyagers detect cosmic rays using its Cosmic Ray Subsystem, under Edward C. Stone and Alan C. Cummings.

Voyager 1 crossed the termination shock in 2004 without detecting the anticipated local ACR source peak, proposed by almost all models; it was called the Voyager paradox. A proposed resolution by McComas (2006) invokes a blunt, asymmetric termination shock, with more efficient acceleration along the flanks rather than near the nose, consistent with subsequent multi-spacecraft observations and modeling.

Several alternative models were proposed: "compressive turbulence in the heliosheath", "magnetic reconnection near the heliopause", "second-order Fermi processes", and "the combination of shock and magnetic islands acceleration".

According to McComas et al. (2019), the blunt termination shock is "a simple and natural extension of the previously accepted ACR acceleration mechanism", supported by observations:

(1) variations of ACRs in response to transient events enabled reasonable estimations of the TS location prior to Voyager 1's crossing; (2) inner heliosheath parameters applied to simple shock acceleration models yield consistent acceleration times approaching 1 yr; (3) prior to each spacecraft's TS crossing, low-energy ACRs were observed to stream preferentially from the nearer side of the TS

Using the blunt termination shock theory McComas & Schwadron (2006) predicted "the progressive unfolding of the ACR spectrum as each of the Voyagers moved out further beyond the TS into the surrounding heliosheath", which occurred as predicted.

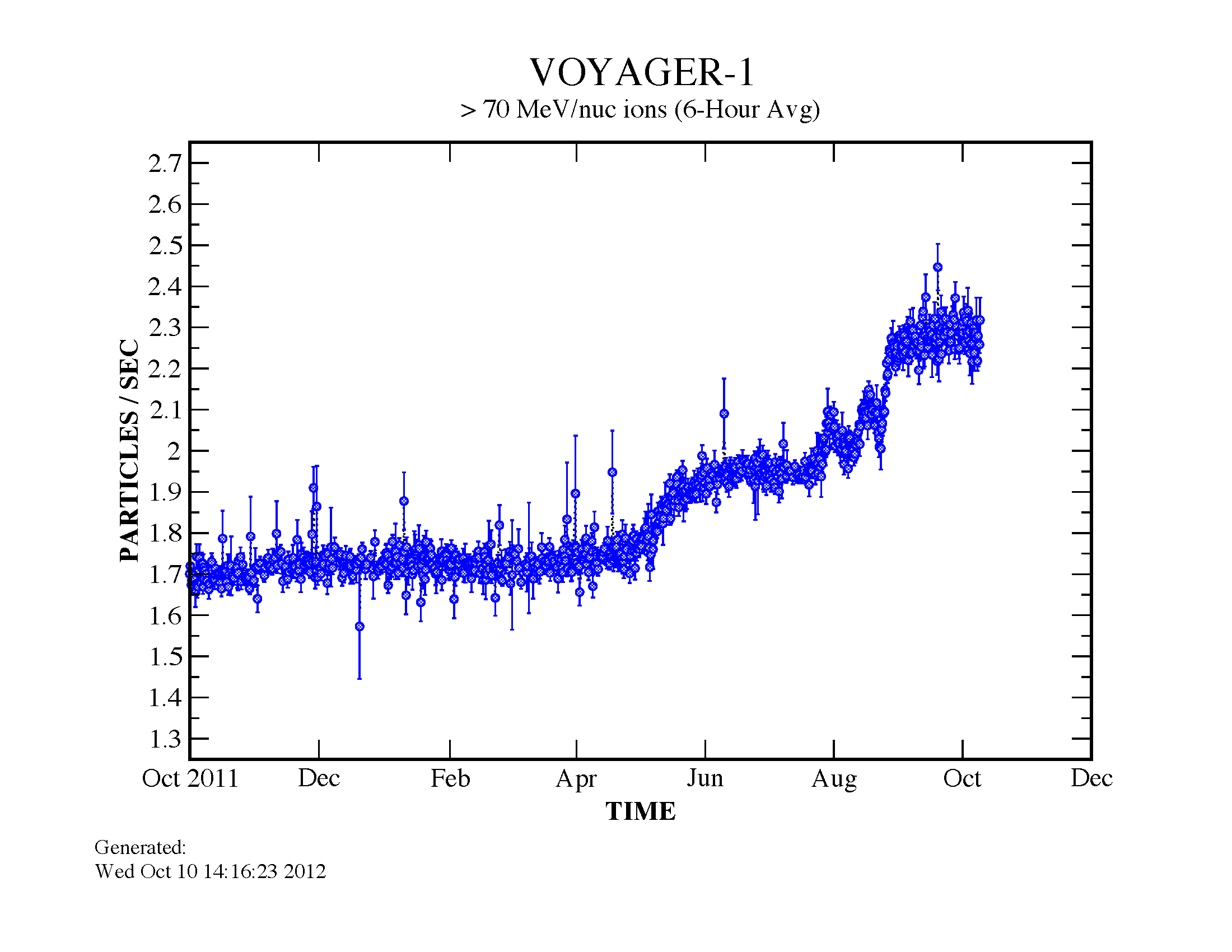
Cosmic ray measurements by Voyager 1 from 2011 to 2012, a time when it is thought to have exited the heliosphere

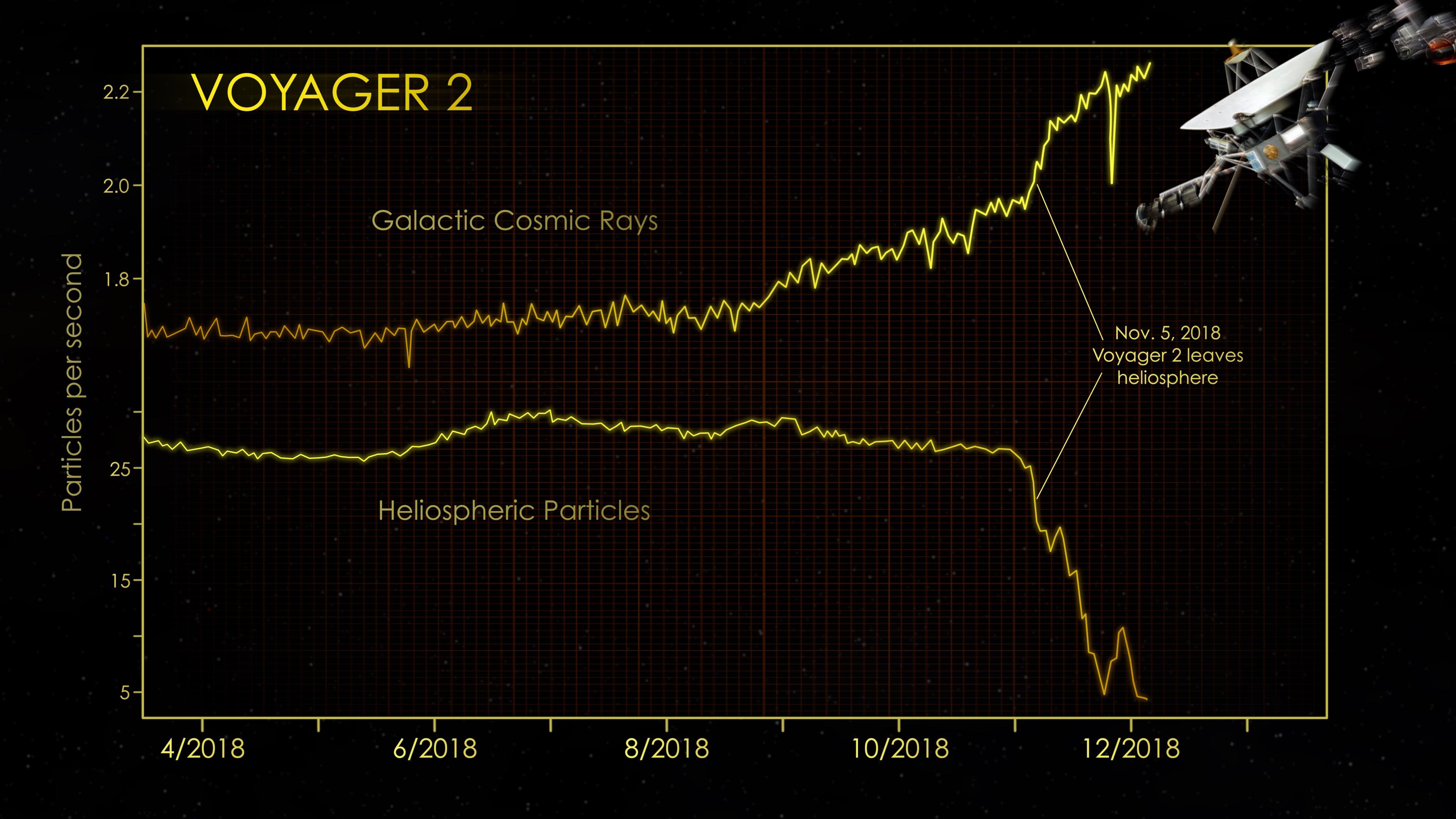
Cosmic ray counts observed by Voyager 2 leaving the heliosphere on November 5, 2018.

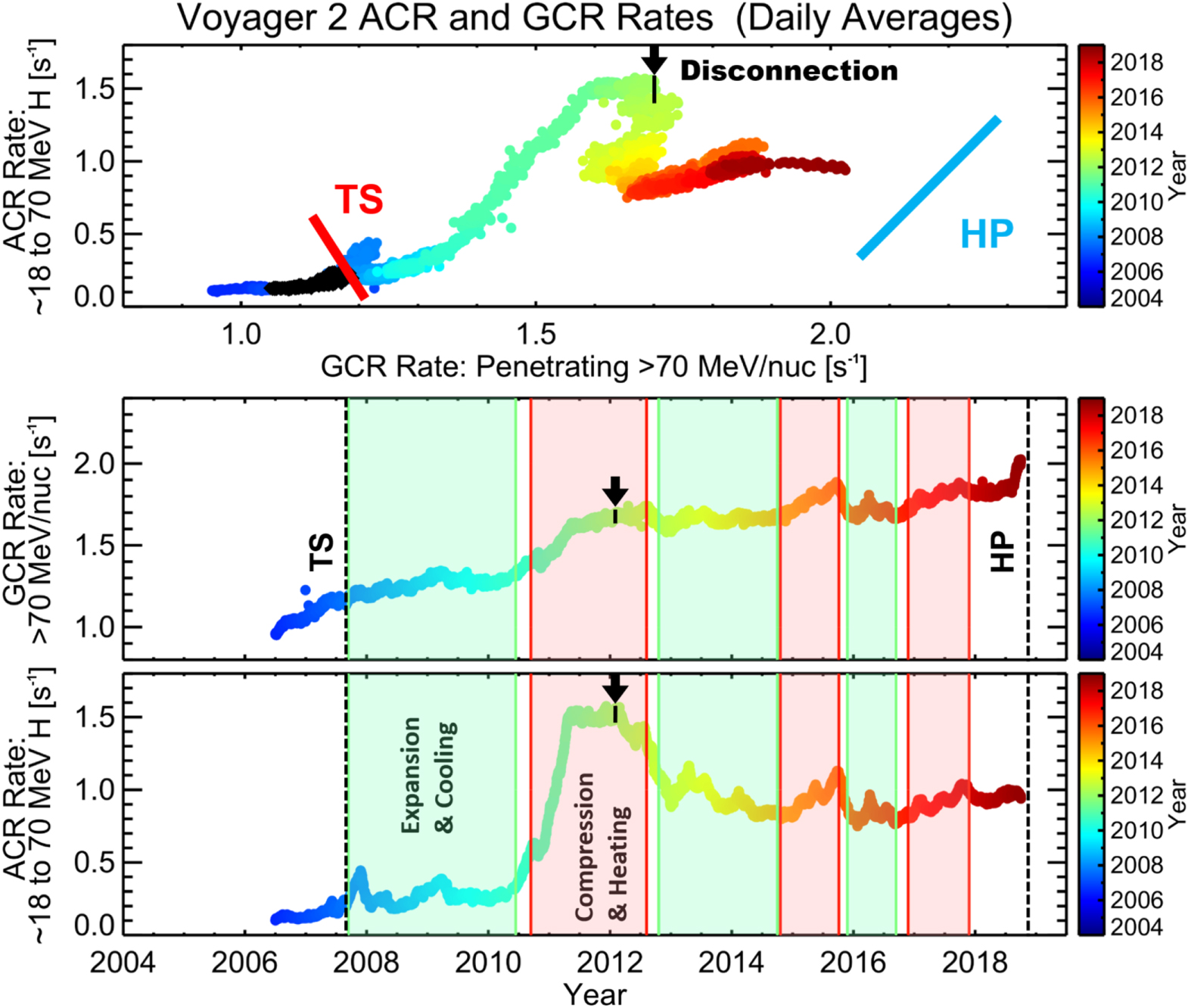
Comparison of H ACR- vs. GCR-dominated rates for Voyager 2 (top). The bottom two panels compare the ACR and GCR rates separately with intervals of expansion and cooling (green) and compression and heating (red) at Voyager 2
