= Alan C. Cummings =

American astrophysicist (born 1944)

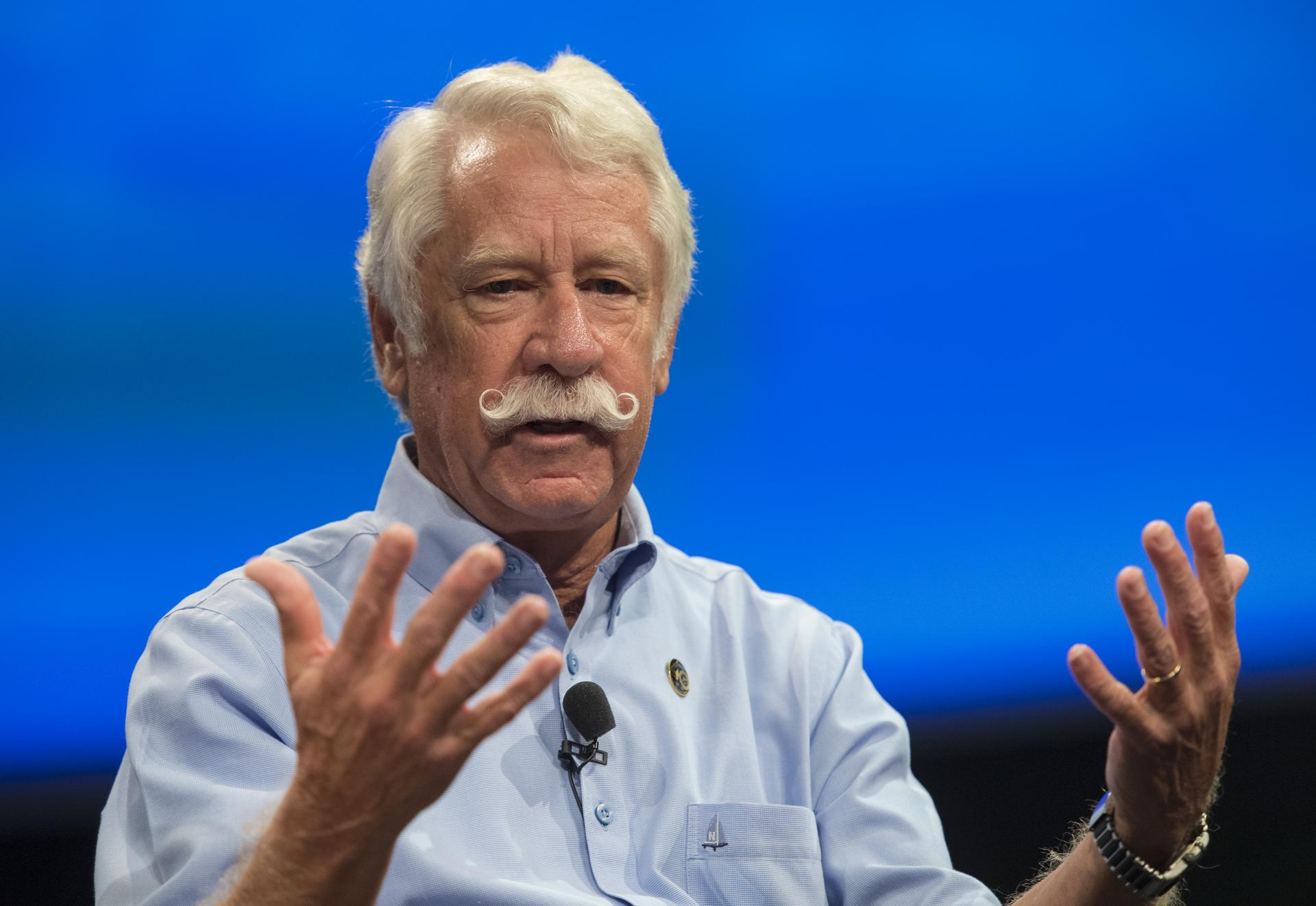
- Cummings in 2017
- Born: Alan Coffman Cummings; 1944 (age 81–82)
- Education: Rice University (BA); California Institute of Technology (PhD)
- Scientific career
- Fields: cosmic ray physics
- Institutions: Caltech
- Thesis: A Study of Cosmic-Ray Positron and Electron Spectra in Interplanetary and Interstellar Space and the Solar Modulation of Cosmic Rays (1973)
- Doctoral advisors: Rochus Eugen Vogt

Alan Coffman Cummings (born in 1944) is an American astrophysicist and cosmic ray researcher who has served as a Senior Research Scientist at the California Institute of Technology (Caltech) since 1973. He is best known as an investigator of NASA's Voyager program's Cosmic Ray Subsystem and as a leading expert on galactic cosmic rays in interstellar space.

== Biography ==
Alan Coffman Cummings grew up in Wichita Falls, Texas. He was the youngest child, with two brothers and a sister. He had a competitive family where academic excellence was standard, his older brother was a state football champion and his sister a junior tennis champion. Cummings also played tennis. His father worked in a peanut distribution business after the Great Depression forced him out of teaching mathematics.

Cummings attended Rice University when it had a free tuition period. Before that, he received a tennis scholarship from the University of Oklahoma, but his mother "shot that down" as it was not enough to cover the full tuition. After Rice, he spent a year at Cambridge University in England on a Winston Churchill Foundation Fellowship, where he first considered becoming an astronaut after corresponding with Alan Shepard by mail. Cummings spent two summers working at Los Alamos Laboratory on Project Vela, which detected nuclear tests.

... I took a course in space physics, and when I got to the cosmic ray part of that course, I said, "This is the most boring thing I can imagine. I'm not going into this." And of course it's exactly what I went into and what I've been doing ever since.

— Alan Cummings

Cummings arrived at Caltech as a graduate student in 1967, joining the Space Radiation Laboratory under Rochus Eugen Vogt and Edward C. Stone. He earned his PhD in physics in 1973 with a thesis on cosmic ray positrons and electrons based on balloon-borne experiments launched from Fort Churchill, Manitoba, Canada.

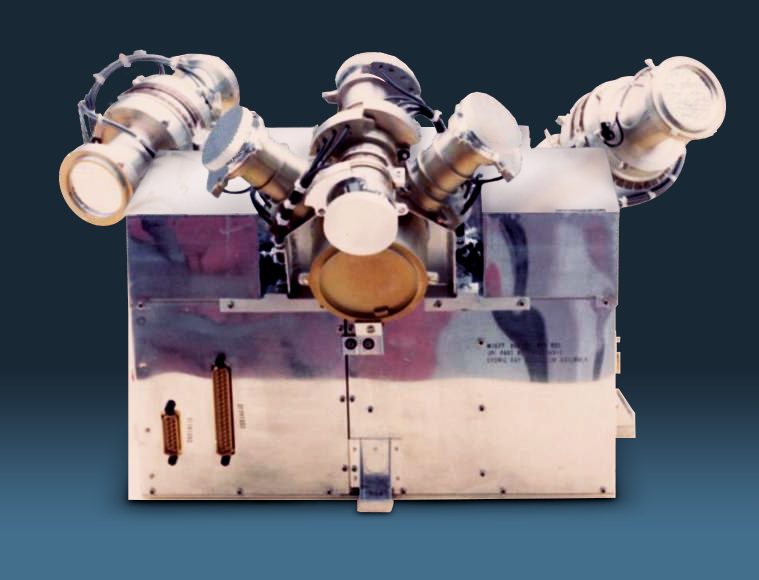
Cosmic Ray Subsystem

According to Cummings, his career took a decisive turn in mid-1973 when his PhD thesis experiment, a cosmic ray detector carried by balloon to the edge of the atmosphere, malfunctioned and drifted over the Soviet Union. He was able to retrieve the wreckage after a trip to Moscow, but the equipment was too damaged to rebuild. Cummings described the failure to be "fortunate in a way" because after it he was hired as a staff scientist to work on Voyager's Cosmic Ray Subsystem (CRS), led by Vogt and Stone, skipping a postdoc position. He took part in development and testing of the low-energy telescopes and electron telescope components.

Cummings is the last person who physically touched both Voyager spacecraft before launch in 1977, performing final inspections of the telescope windows a few days before launch. Cummings has worked at Caltech and on the Voyager mission for more than 50 years. He became CRS's principal investigator after Ed Stone's retirement.

As part of the CRS team, Cummings was involved in measuring the composition and energy spectra of galactic cosmic rays in interstellar space, what he calls "the holy grail of cosmic ray physics". When Voyager 1 crossed into interstellar space in 2012, it provided first direct measurements of cosmic rays beyond the solar system's influence.

Beyond Voyager, Cummings worked on cosmic ray detectors for other spacecraft missions, including ISEE-3, ACE (Advanced Composition Explorer), STEREO (twin solar observatories), and Parker Solar Probe's EPI-Hi instrument. He has delivered three Theodore von Kármán Lectures at JPL (2007, 2012, and 2017).

== Caltech Bird Walks ==
In 1986, Cummings co-founded Caltech's weekly birdwatching group with Ernie Franzgrote. At that time, he had already been birdwatching for nearly 20 years; all of his siblings are also birdwatchers. As of 2023, the group has conducted over 1,700 walks, with Cummings meticulously documenting every sighting. He maintains detailed data of bird populations on campus, noting long-term trends and seasonal patterns. A newspaper article from 1998 claimed that Cummings "spotted 450 out of a total 750 U.S. species".

== Personal life ==
Cummings met his wife Suzette on her birthday in March 1973 while he was at Caltech delivering his thesis for printing. They had their first date six days later, on his birthday, and married in October 1973. Their son was born in 1975. Suzette worked in various administrative roles at Caltech for over 40 years. She was recognized as an honorary alumna in 2001.

== Selected publications ==
According to his Bibliography page Cummings has authored or coauthored 172 papers in peer-reviewed journals. According to his Google Scholar page, 57 of those have been cited more than 13,000 times as of 2025.

- Stone, E. C.; Cohen, C. M. S.; Cook, W. R.; et al. (1998). "The Cosmic-Ray Isotope Spectrometer for the Advanced Composition Explorer". The Advanced Composition Explorer Mission. Springer Netherlands. pp. 285–356. doi:10.1007/978-94-011-4762-0_14. ISBN 978-94-010-6001-1. Archived from the original on June 16, 2018.
- Stone, E. C.; Cohen, C. M. S.; Cook, W. R.; Cummings, A. C.; Gauld, B.; Kecman, B.; Leske, R. A.; Mewaldt, R. A.; Thayer, M. R.; Dougherty, B. L.; Grumm, R. L.; Milliken, B. D.; Radocinski, R. G.; Wiedenbeck, M. E.; Christian, E. R.; Shuman, S.; Von Rosenvinge, T. T. (1998). "The Solar Isotope Spectrometer for the Advanced Composition Explorer". The Advanced Composition Explorer Mission. Springer Netherlands. pp. 357–408. doi:10.1007/978-94-011-4762-0_15. ISBN 978-94-010-6001-1.
- Yanasak, N. E.; Wiedenbeck, M. E.; Mewaldt, R. A.; Davis, A. J.; Cummings, A. C.; George, J. S.; Leske, R. A.; Stone, E. C.; Christian, E. R.; von Rosenvinge, T. T.; Binns, W. R.; Hink, P. L.; Israel, M. H. (December 20, 2001). "Measurement of the secondary radionuclides 10Be, 26Al, 36Cl, 54Mn, and 14C and implications for the galactic cosmic-ray age". The Astrophysical Journal. 563 (2): 768–792. doi:10.1086/323842.
- Stone, E. C.; Cummings, A. C.; McDonald, F. B.; Heikkila, B. C.; Lal, N.; Webber, W. R. (2005). "Voyager 1 Explores the Termination Shock Region and the Heliosheath Beyond". Science. 309 (5743): 2017–2020. Bibcode:2005Sci...309.2017S. doi:10.1126/science.1117684. PMID 16179468. Archived from the original on June 26, 2025.
- Stone, Edward C.; Cummings, Alan C.; McDonald, Frank B.; Heikkila, Bryant C.; Lal, Nand; Webber, William R. (2008). "An asymmetric solar wind termination shock". Nature. 454 (7200): 71–74. Bibcode:2008Natur.454...71S. doi:10.1038/nature07022. ISSN 1476-4687. PMID 18596802.
- Luhmann, J. G.; et al. (2008). "STEREO IMPACT Investigation Goals, Measurements, and Data Products Overview". The STEREO Mission. Springer. pp. 117–184. Bibcode:2008stmi.book..117L. doi:10.1007/978-0-387-09649-0_6. ISBN 978-0-387-09648-3. Archived from the original on June 14, 2018.
- Stone, E. C.; Cummings, A. C.; McDonald, F. B.; Heikkila, B. C.; Lal, N.; Webber, W. R. (2013). "Voyager 1 Observes Low-Energy Galactic Cosmic Rays in a Region Depleted of Heliospheric Ions". Science. 341 (6142): 150–153. Bibcode:2013Sci...341..150S. doi:10.1126/science.1236408. PMID 23811227.
- Cummings, A. C.; Stone, E. C.; Heikkila, B. C.; Lal, N.; Webber, W. R.; Jóhannesson, G.; Moskalenko, I. V.; Orlando, E.; Porter, T. A. (2016). "Galactic cosmic rays in the local interstellar medium: Voyager 1 observations and model results". The Astrophysical Journal. 831 (1): 18. Bibcode:2016ApJ...831...18C. doi:10.3847/0004-637x/831/1/18. PMC 8507217. PMID 34646042.
- McComas, D. J.; et al. (2016). "Integrated Science Investigation of the Sun (ISIS): Design of the Energetic Particle Investigation". Space Science Reviews. 204 (1): 187–256. Bibcode:2016SSRv..204..187M. doi:10.1007/s11214-014-0059-1. ISSN 1572-9672.
