= Interstellar Boundary Explorer =

NASA satellite of the Explorer program

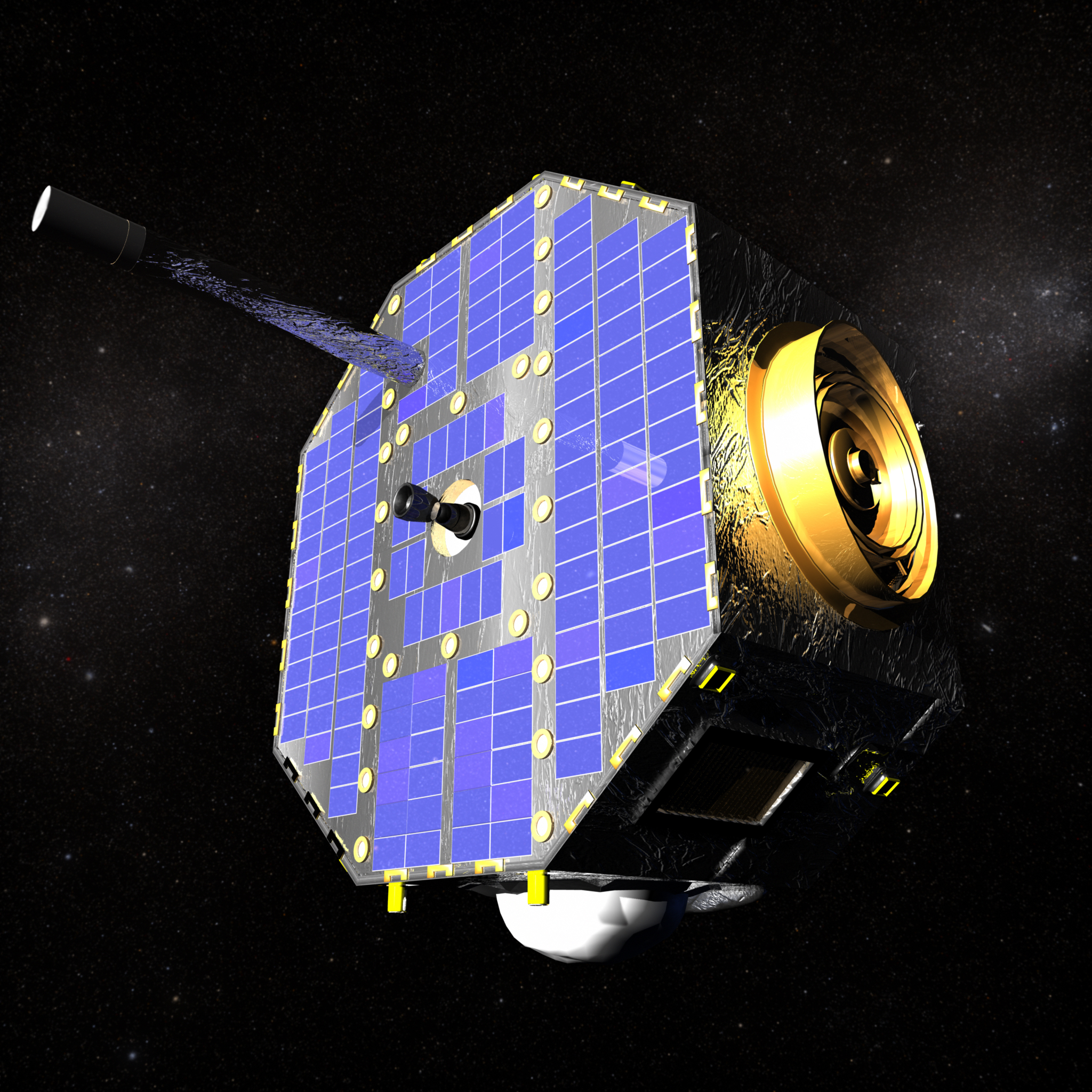
- IBEX satellite
- Names: Explorer 91; IBEX; SMEX-10
- Mission type: Astronomy
- Operator: NASA
- COSPAR ID: 2008-051A
- SATCAT no.: 33401
- Website: ibex.swri.edu
- Mission duration: 2 years (planned); 17 years, 10 months, 29 days (in progress)

Spacecraft properties
- Spacecraft: Explorer XCI
- Spacecraft type: Interstellar Boundary Explorer
- Bus: MicroStar-1
- Manufacturer: Orbital Sciences Corporation
- Launch mass: 485 kg (1,069 lb)
- Dry mass: 105 kg (231 lb)
- Payload mass: 26 kg (57 lb)
- Dimensions: 58 × 95 cm (23 × 37 in)
- Power: 116 watts

Start of mission
- Launch date: 19 October 2008, 17:47:23 UTC
- Rocket: Pegasus XL (F40)
- Launch site: Bucholz Airfield, Stargazer
- Contractor: Orbital Sciences Corporation
- Entered service: January 2009

Orbital parameters
- Reference system: Geocentric orbit
- Regime: High Earth orbit
- Perigee altitude: 7,000 km (4,300 mi)
- Apogee altitude: 220,886 km (137,252 mi)
- Inclination: 10.99°
- Period: 6604.00 minutes

Instruments
- IBEX-Lo; IBEX-Hi
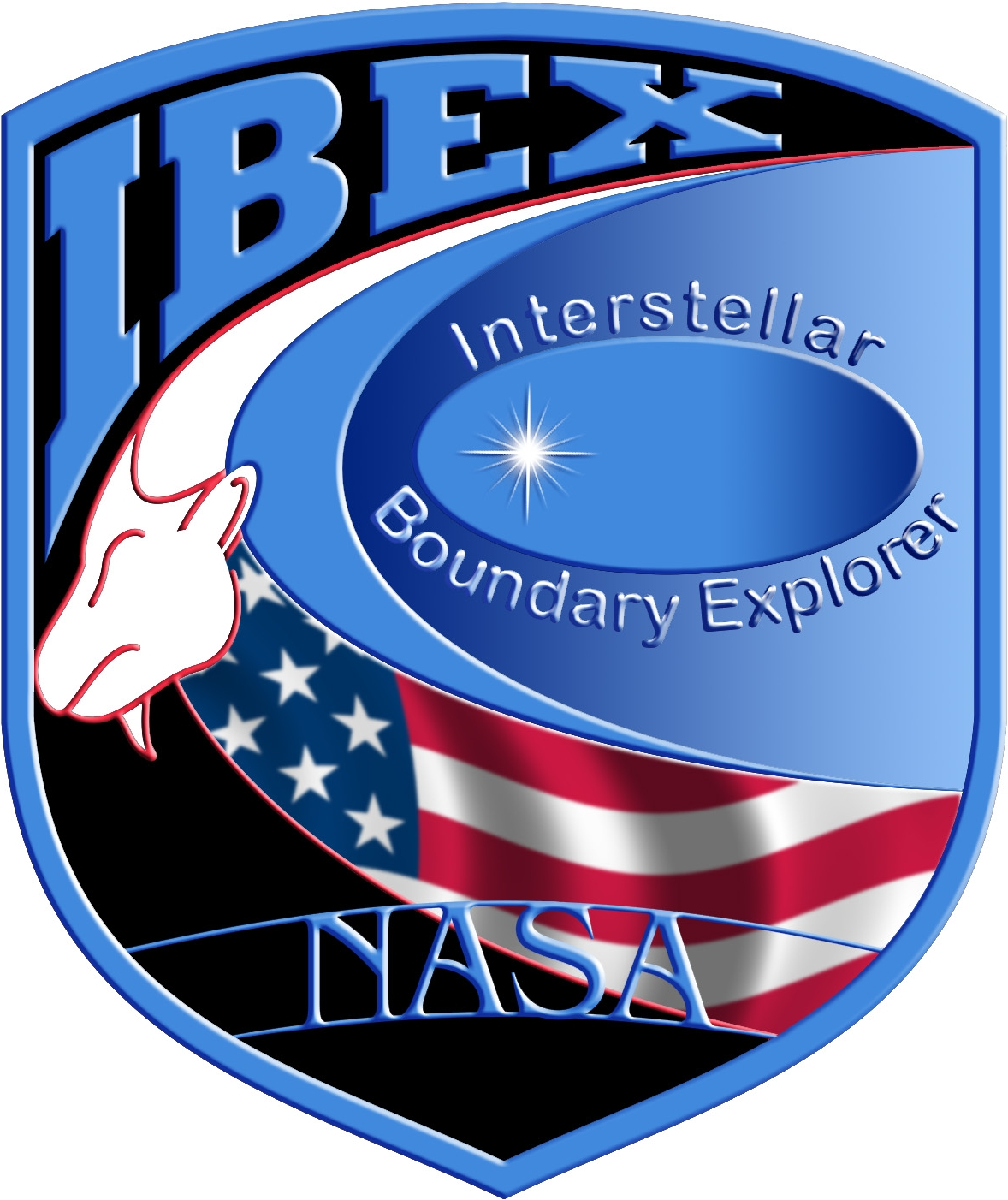
- IBEX mission logo Explorer program

Interstellar Boundary Explorer (IBEX or Explorer 91 or SMEX-10) is a NASA satellite in Earth orbit that uses energetic neutral atoms (ENAs) to image the interaction region between the Solar System and interstellar space. The mission is part of NASA's Small Explorer program and was launched with a Pegasus-XL launch vehicle on 19 October 2008.

The mission is led by Dr. David J. McComas (IBEX principal investigator), formerly of the Southwest Research Institute (SwRI) and now with Princeton University. The Los Alamos National Laboratory and the Lockheed Martin Advanced Technology Center built the IBEX-Hi and IBEX-Lo sensors respectively. The Orbital Sciences Corporation manufactured the satellite bus and was the location for spacecraft environmental testing. The nominal mission baseline duration was two years after commissioning, and the prime ended in early 2011. The spacecraft and sensors are still healthy and the mission is continuing in its extended mission.

IBEX is in a Sun-oriented spin-stabilized orbit around the Earth. In June 2011, IBEX was shifted to a new, more efficient, much more stable orbit. It does not come as close to the Moon in the new orbit, and expends less fuel to maintain its position.

The spacecraft is equipped with two large aperture imagers which detect ENAs with energies from 10 eV to 2 keV (IBEX-Lo) and 300 eV to 6 keV (IBEX-Hi).

The mission was originally planned to be a 24-month operations period. The mission has since been extended, with the spacecraft still in operation as of 2024.

== Spacecraft ==
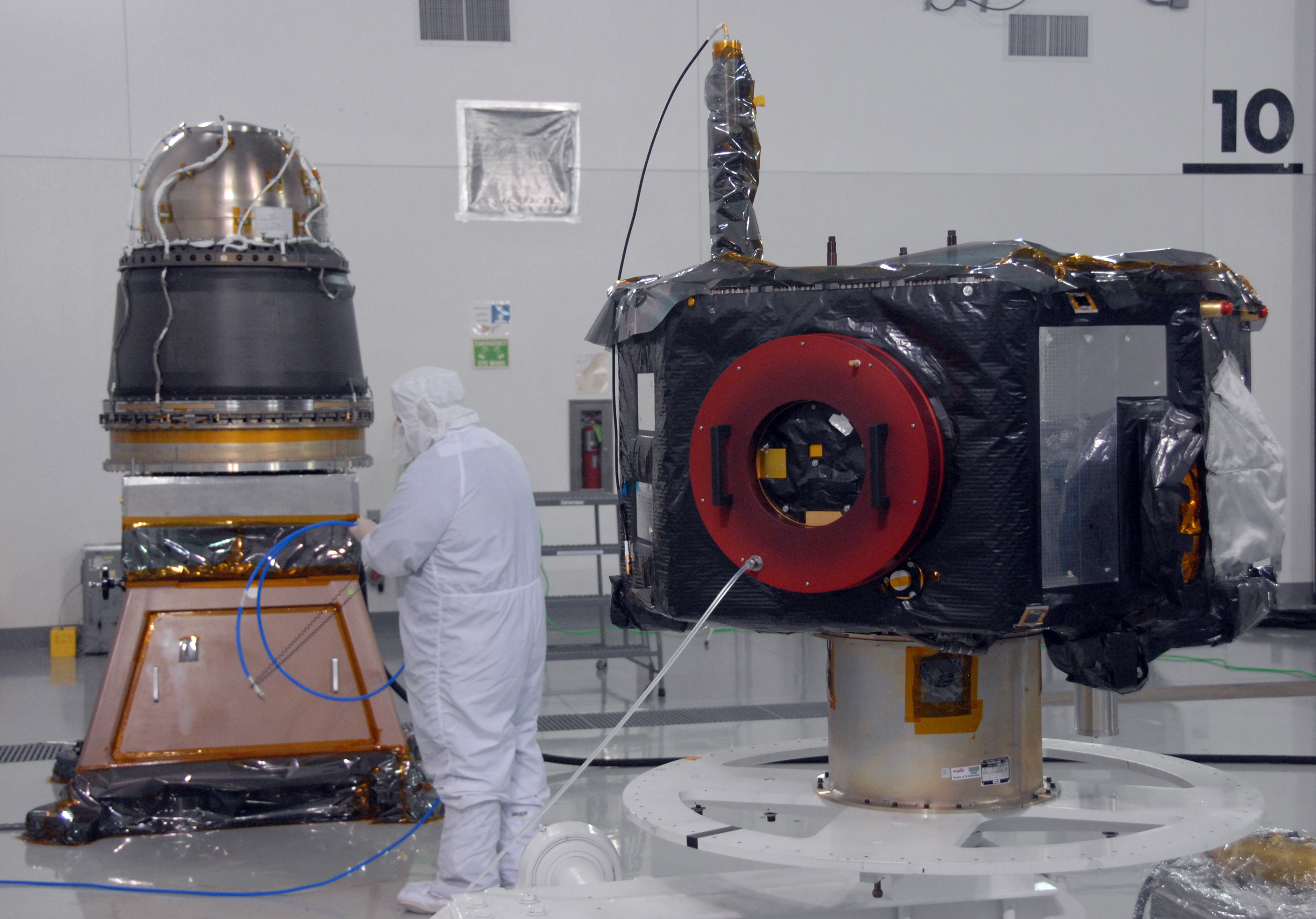
IBEX (right) and Star 27.

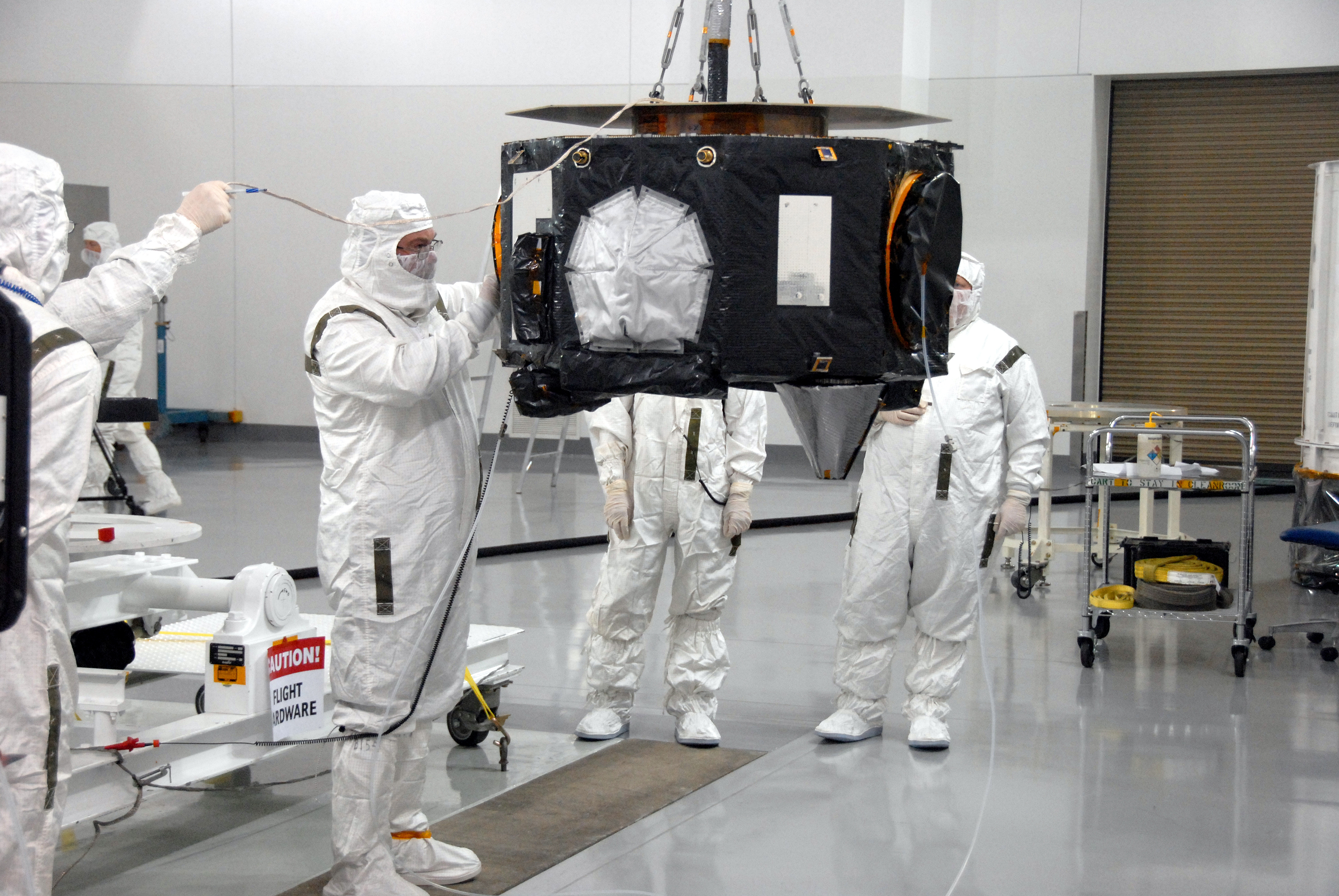
IBEX spin balance testing

The spacecraft is built on an octagonal base, roughly 58 cm (23 in) high and 95 cm (37 in) across. The dry mass is 80 kg (180 lb) and the instrument payload comprises 26 kg (57 lb). The fully fueled mass is 107 kg (236 lb), and the entire flight system launch mass, including the ATK Star 27 solid rocket motor, is 462 kg (1,019 lb). The spacecraft itself has a hydrazine attitude control system. Power is produced by a solar array with a capability of 116 watts, and nominal power use is 66 W (16 W for the payload). Communications are via two hemispherical antennas with a nominal downlink data rate of 320 kbps and an uplink rate of 2 kbps.

== Science goal ==
The Interstellar Boundary Explorer (IBEX) mission science goal is to discover the nature of the interactions between the solar wind and the interstellar medium at the edge of the Solar System. IBEX has achieved this goal by generating full sky maps of the intensity (integrated over the line-of-sight) of ENAs in a range of energies every six months. Most of these ENAs are generated in the heliosheath, which is the region of interaction.

== Mission ==
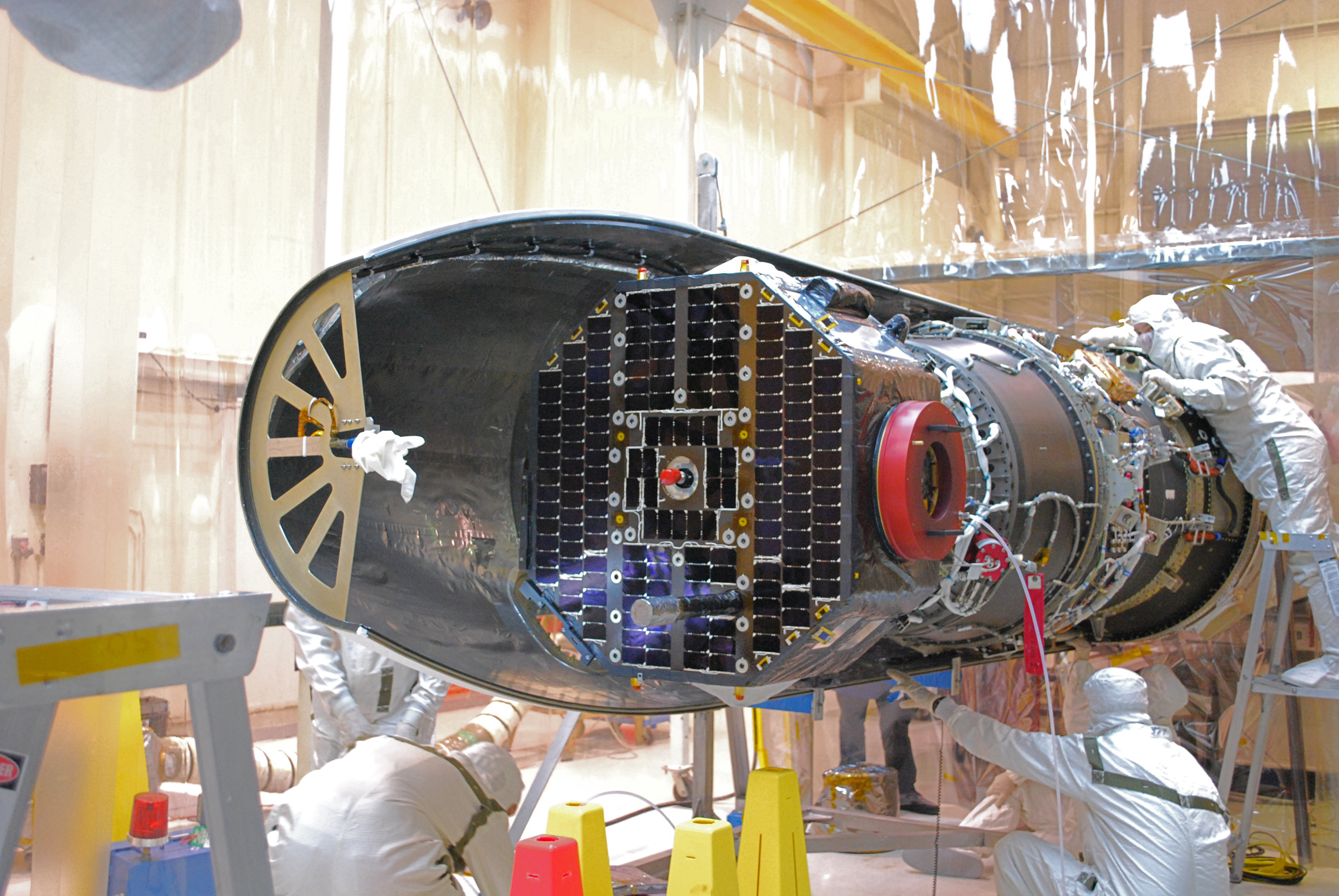
IBEX in a fairing

=== Launch ===
The IBEX satellite was mated to its Pegasus XL launch vehicle at Vandenberg Air Force Base, California, and the combined vehicle was then suspended below the Lockheed L-1011 Stargazer mother airplane and flown to Kwajalein Atoll in the central Pacific Ocean. Stargazer arrived at Kwajalein Atoll on 12 October 2008.

The IBEX satellite was carried into space on 19 October 2008, by the Pegasus XL launch vehicle. The launch vehicle was released from Stargazer, which took off from Kwajalein Atoll, at 17:47:23 UTC. By launching from this site close to the equator, the Pegasus launch vehicle lifted as much as 16 kg (35 lb) more mass to orbit than it would have with a launch from the Kennedy Space Center in Florida.

=== Mission profile ===
The IBEX satellite initially launched into a highly elliptical transfer orbit with a low perigee and used a solid fuel rocket motor as its final boost stage at apogee in order to raise its perigee greatly and to achieve its desired high-altitude elliptical orbit.

IBEX is in a highly eccentric elliptical terrestrial orbit, which ranges from a perigee of about 86,000 km (53,000 mi) to an apogee of about 260,000 km (160,000 mi). Its original orbit was about 7,000 × 320,000 km (4,300 × 198,800 mi) — that is, about 80% of the distance to the Moon — which has changed primarily due to an intentional adjustment to prolong the spacecraft's useful life.

This very high orbit allows the IBEX satellite to move out of the Earth's magnetosphere when making scientific observations. This extreme altitude is critical due to the amount of charged-particle interference that would occur while taking measurements within the magnetosphere. When within the magnetosphere of the Earth (70,000 km (43,000 mi)), the satellite also performs other functions, including telemetry downlinks.

=== Orbit adjusted ===
In June 2011, IBEX shifted to a new orbit that raised its perigee to more than 30,000 km (19,000 mi). The new orbit has a period of one third of a lunar month, which, with the correct phasing, avoids taking the spacecraft too close to the Moon, whose gravity can negatively affect IBEX's orbit. The spacecraft now uses less fuel to maintain a stable orbit, increasing its useful lifespan to more than 40 years.

=== Instruments ===
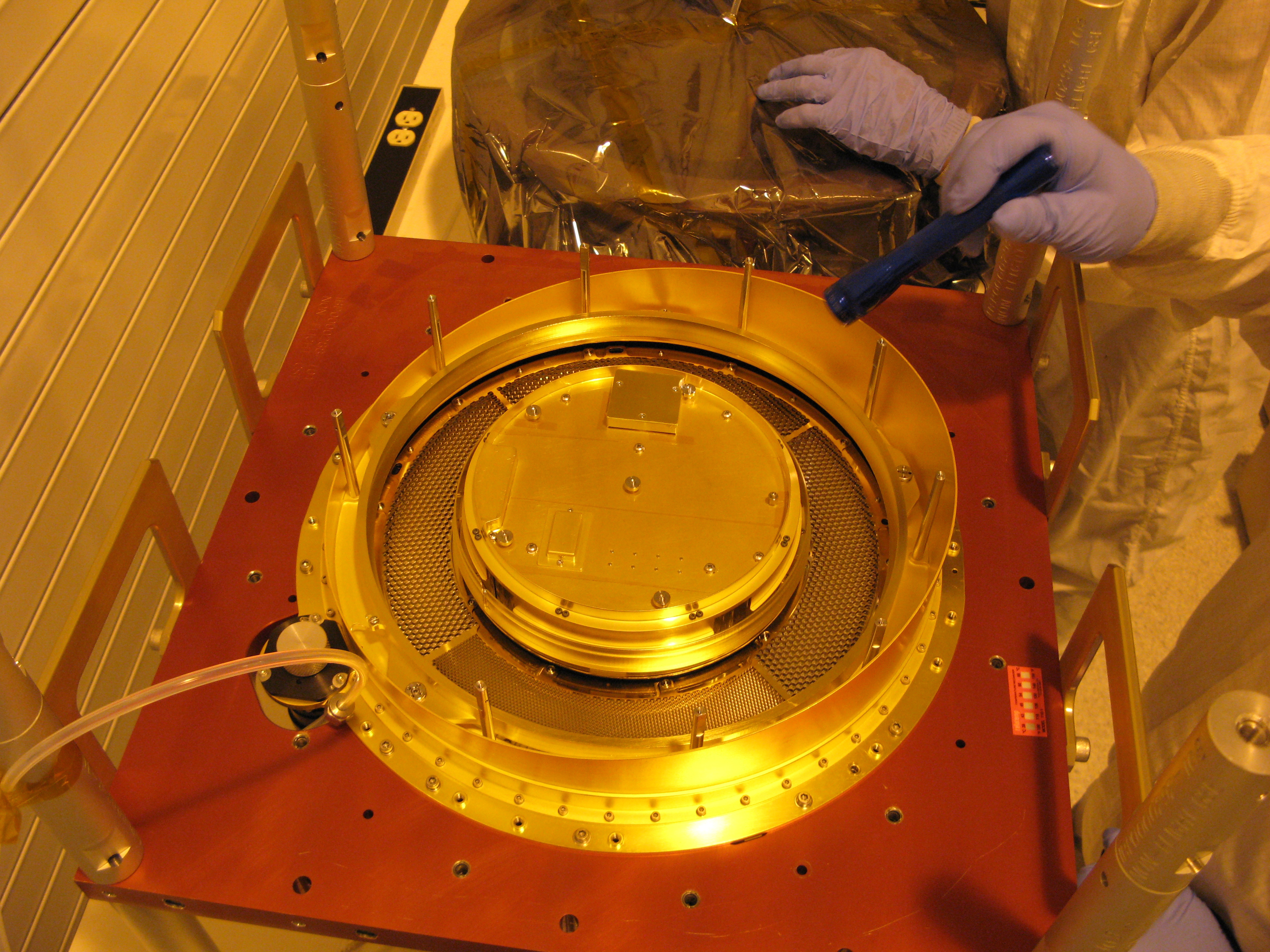
IBEX Lo sensor

The heliospheric boundary of the Solar System is being imaged by measuring the location and magnitude of charge-exchange collisions occurring in all directions. The satellite's payload consists of two energetic neutral atom (ENA) imagers, IBEX-Hi and IBEX-Lo. Each consists of a collimator that limits their fields of view (FoV) a conversion surface to convert neutral hydrogen and oxygen into ions, an electrostatic analyzer (ESA) to suppress ultraviolet light and to select ions of a specific energy range, and a detector to count particles and identify the type of each ion. Both of these sensors are a single-pixel camera with a field of view of roughly 7° x 7°. The IBEX-Hi instrument is recording particle counts in a higher energy band (300 eV to 6 keV) than the IBEX-Lo energy band (10 eV to 2 keV). The scientific payload also includes a Combined Electronics Unit (CEU) that controls the voltages on the collimator and the ESA, and it reads and records data from the particle detectors of each sensor.

=== Communication ===
Compared to other space observatories, IBEX has a low data transfer rate due to the limited requirements of the mission.

... IBEX data transfer rates are slow compared with other telescopes due to the nature of the data it collects. IBEX does not need a "high speed" connection, since it only has the opportunity to collect up to a few particles per minute. Communication from the satellite to the ground is 20 times slower than a typical home cable modem (320,000 bits per second) [is the satellite's transfer speed], and from the ground to the satellite only 2,000 bits per second, which is 250 times slower! Once the signal is collected by the receivers on Earth, it is carried over the internet to Mission control center in Dulles, Virginia, and to the IBEX Science Operation Center in San Antonio, Texas".

— NASA's IBEX Q and A

=== Data collection ===
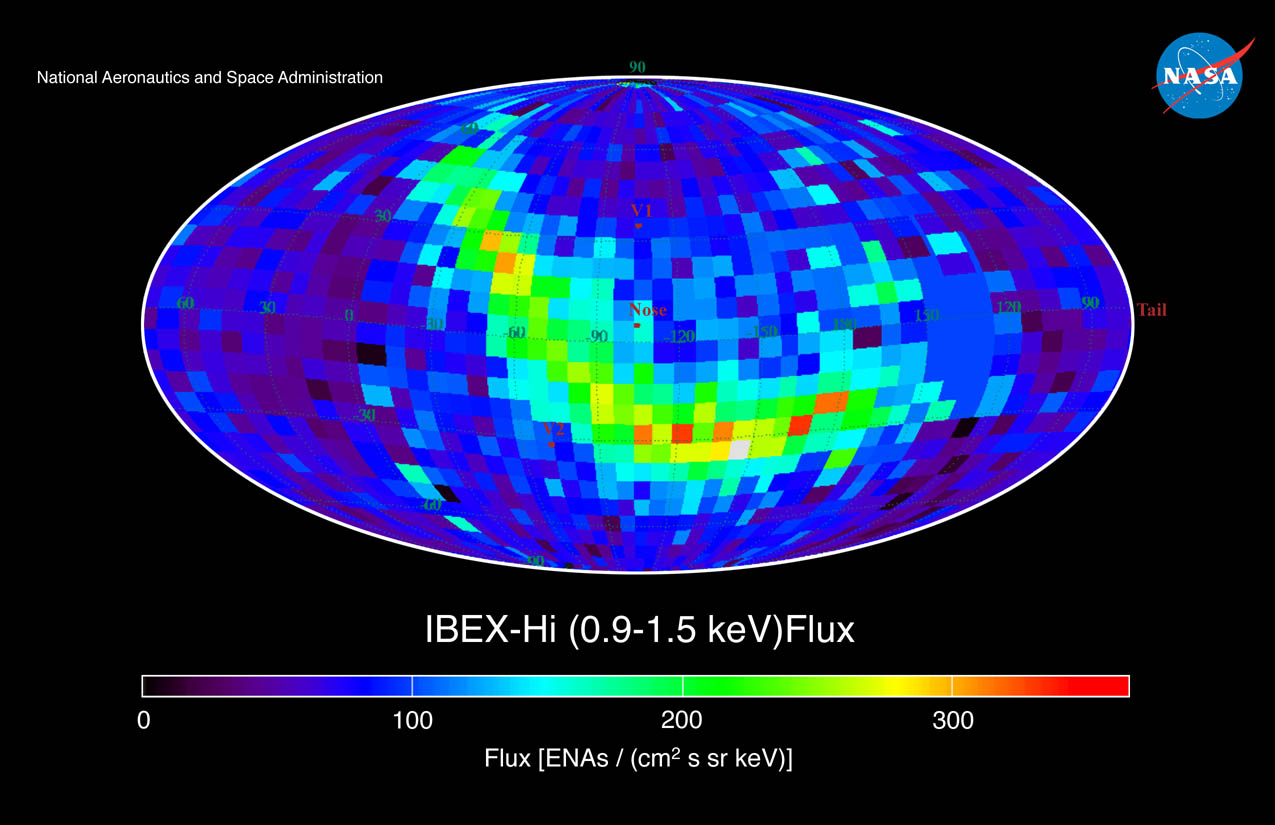
High-energy map of the heliosphere

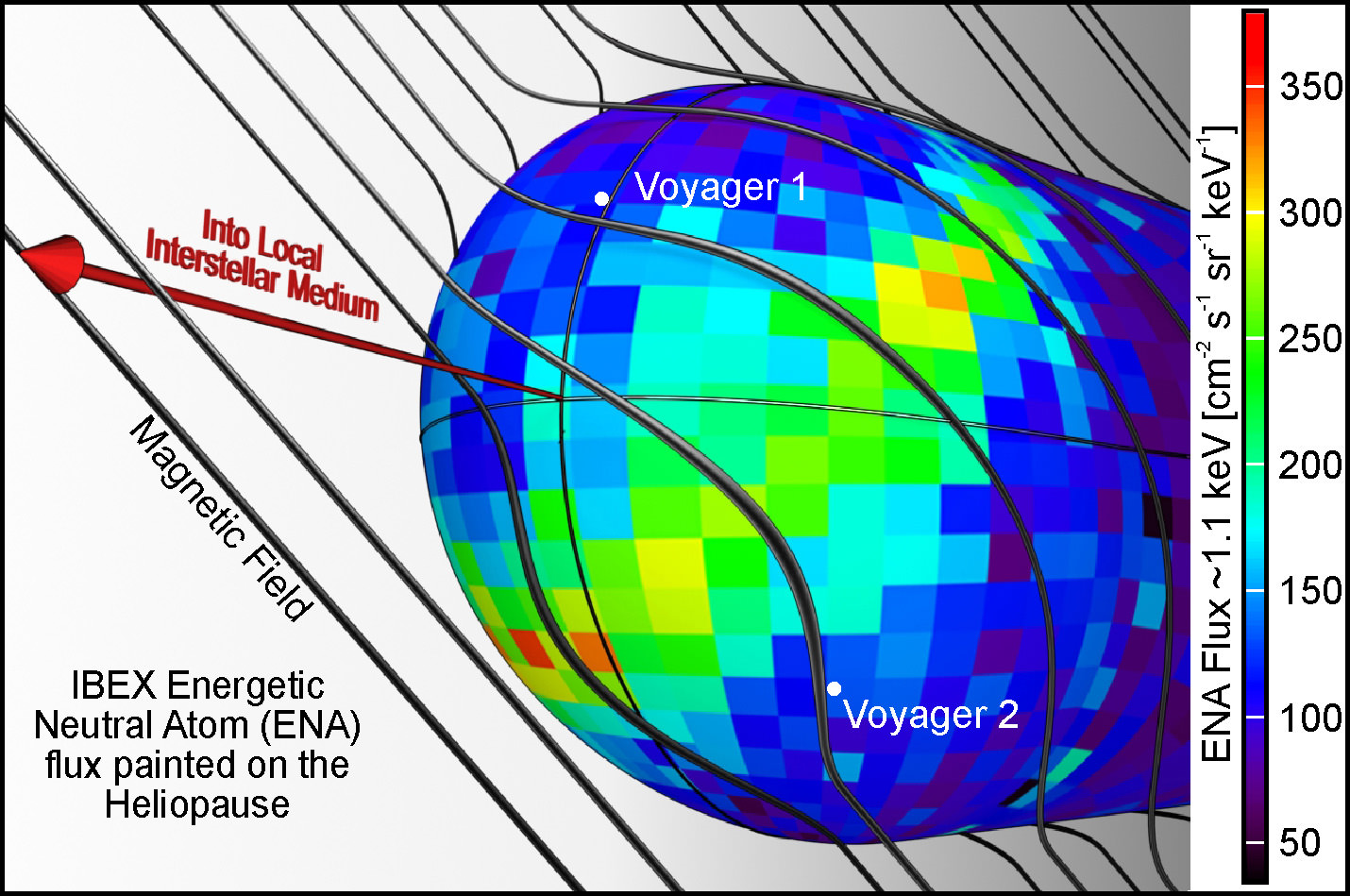
The ribbon of ENA emissions seen in the IBEX map.

IBEX is collecting energetic neutral atom (ENA) emissions that are traveling through the Solar System to Earth and cannot be measured by conventional telescopes. These ENAs are created on the boundary of the Solar System by the interactions between solar wind particles and interstellar medium particles.

On average IBEX-Hi detects about 500 particles per day, and IBEX-Lo, less than 100. By 2012, over 100 scientific papers related to IBEX were published, described by the principal investigator as "an incredible scientific harvest".

=== Data availability ===
As the IBEX data is validated, the IBEX data is made available in a series of data releases on the SwRI IBEX Public Data website. In addition, the data is periodically sent to the NASA Space Physics Data Facility (SPDF), which is the official archive site for IBEX data. SPDF data can be searched at the Heliophysics Data Portal.

== Science results ==
Animation illustrating IBEX's collection of data on neutral atoms at the boundary of the Solar System.

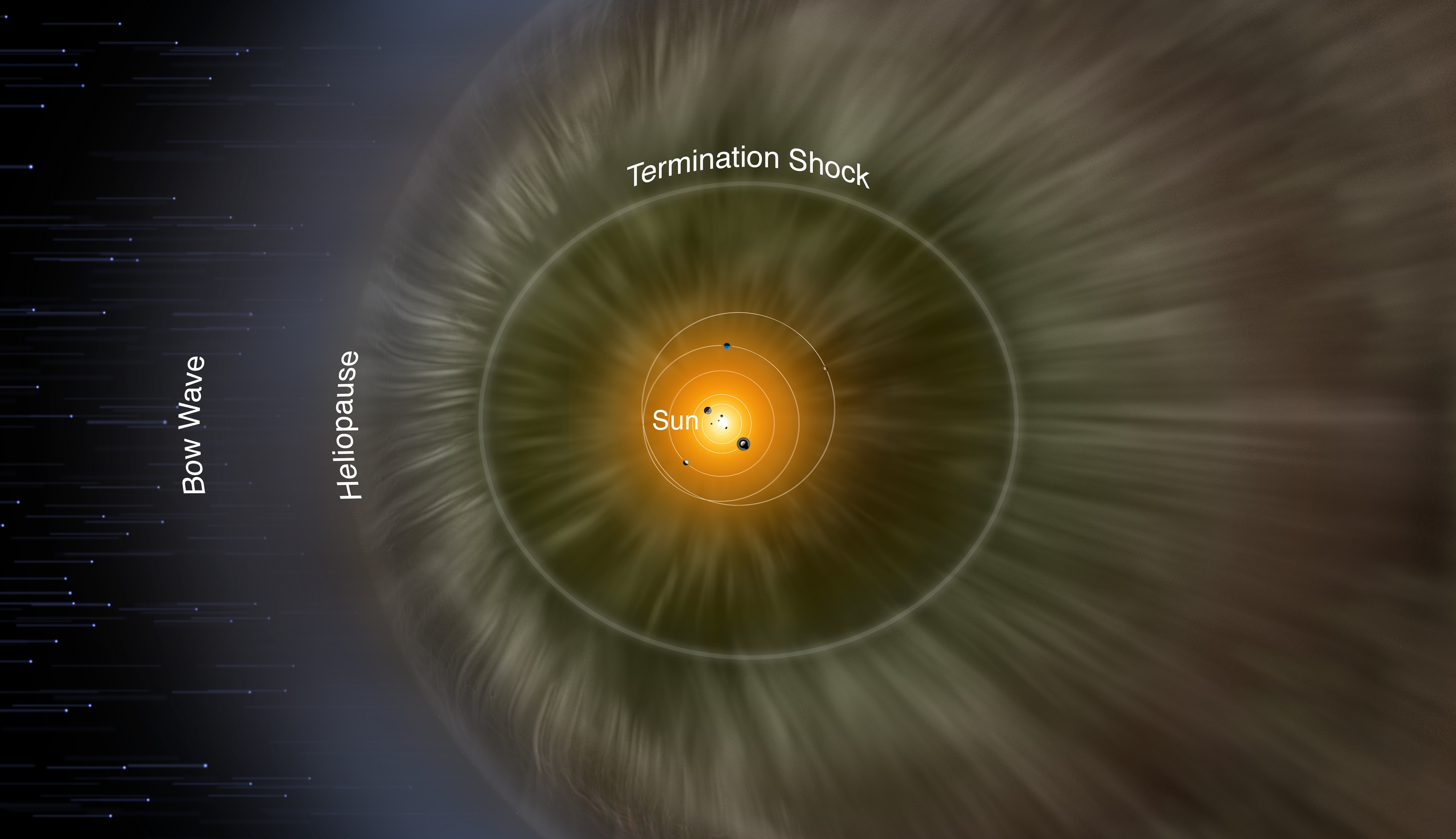
Far beyond the orbit of Neptune, the solar wind and the interstellar medium interact to create a region known as the inner heliosheath, bounded on the inside by the termination shock, and on the outside by the heliopause.

Initial data revealed a previously unpredicted "very narrow ribbon that is two to three times brighter than anything else in the sky". Initial interpretations suggest that "the interstellar environment has far more influence on structuring the heliosphere than anyone previously believed". It is unknown what is creating the energetic neutral atoms (ENA) ribbon. The Sun is currently traveling through the Local Interstellar Cloud, and the heliosphere's size and shape are key factors in determining its shielding power from cosmic rays. Should IBEX detect changes in the shape of the ribbon, that could show how the heliosphere is interacting with the Local Fluff. It has also observed ENAs from the Earth's magnetosphere.

In October 2010, significant changes were detected in the ribbon after six months, based on the second set of IBEX observations.

It went on to detect neutral atoms from outside the Solar System, which were found to differ in composition from the Sun. Surprisingly, IBEX discovered that the heliosphere has no bow shock, and it measured its speed relative to the local interstellar medium (LISM) as 23.2 km/s (14.4 mi/s), improving on the previous measurement of 26.3 km/s (16.3 mi/s) by Ulysses. Those speeds equate to 25% less pressure on the Sun's heliosphere than previously thought.

In July 2013, IBEX results revealed a 4-lobed tail on the Solar System's heliosphere.

== See also ==
- Interstellar Mapping and Acceleration Probe (IMAP), a follow-on mission to IBEX
- David J. McComas, Principal Investigator of IBEX (Princeton University)
