= Space telescope =

Instrument in space to study astronomical objects

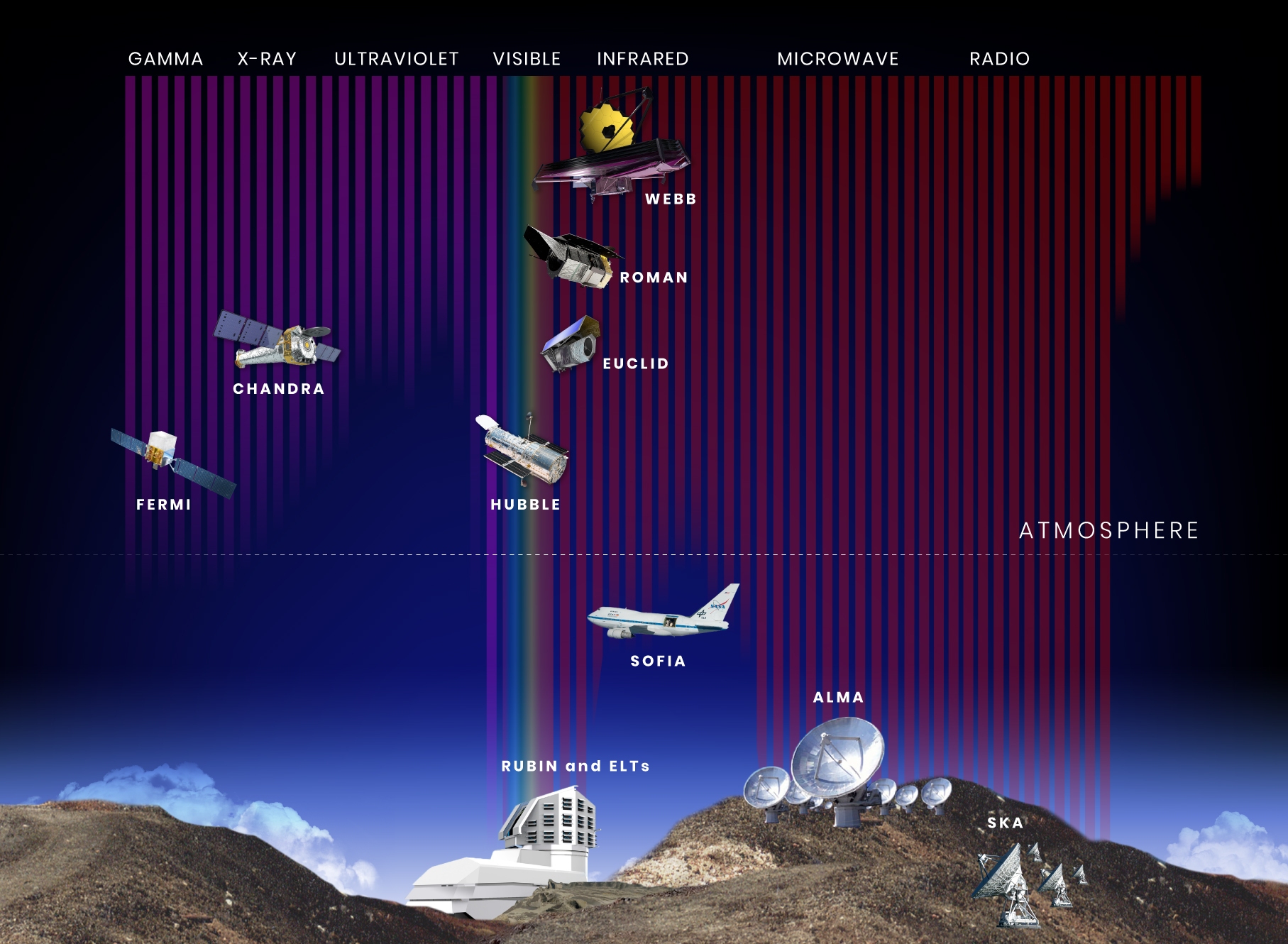
Wavelength sensitivity of Hubble, Webb, Roman, and other major observatories

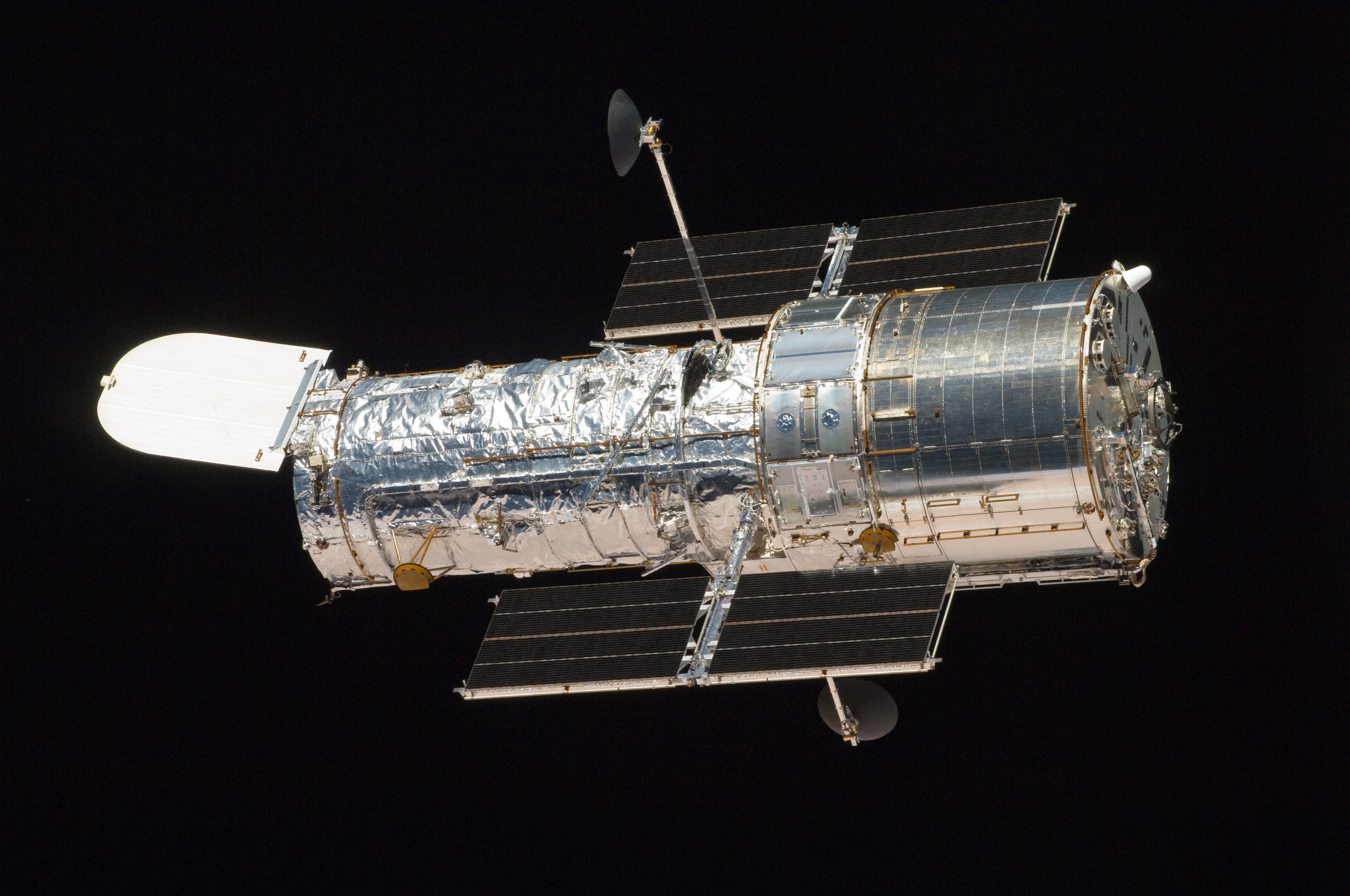
The Hubble Space Telescope, one of the Great Observatories

A space telescope (also known as space observatory) is a telescope in outer space used to observe astronomical objects. Suggested by Lyman Spitzer in 1946, the first operational telescopes were the American Orbiting Astronomical Observatory 2 launched in 1968, and the Soviet Orion 1 ultraviolet telescope aboard space station Salyut 1 in 1971. Space telescopes avoid several problems caused by the Earth's atmosphere, including the absorption or scattering of certain wavelengths of light, obstruction by clouds, and distortions due to atmospheric refraction such as twinkling. Space telescopes can also observe dim objects during the daytime, and they avoid light pollution which ground-based observatories encounter. They are divided into two types: Satellites which map the entire sky (astronomical survey), and satellites which focus on selected astronomical objects or parts of the sky and beyond. Space telescopes are distinct from Earth imaging satellites, which point toward Earth for satellite imaging, applied for weather analysis, espionage, and other types of information gathering.

== History ==
In 1946, American theoretical astrophysicist Lyman Spitzer, aka "father of Hubble" proposed to put a telescope in space. Spitzer's proposal called for a large telescope that would not be hindered by Earth's atmosphere. After lobbying in the 1960s and 1970s for such a system to be built, Spitzer's vision ultimately materialized into the Hubble Space Telescope, which was launched on April 24, 1990, by the Space Shuttle Discovery (STS-31). This was launched due to many efforts by Nancy Grace Roman, aka "mother of Hubble", who was the first Chief of Astronomy and first female executive at NASA. She was a program scientist that worked to convince NASA, the U.S. Congress, and others that Hubble was "very well worth doing".

The first operational space telescopes were the American Orbiting Astronomical Observatory, OAO-2 launched in 1968, and the Soviet Orion 1 ultraviolet telescope aboard space station Salyut 1 in 1971.

== Advantages ==
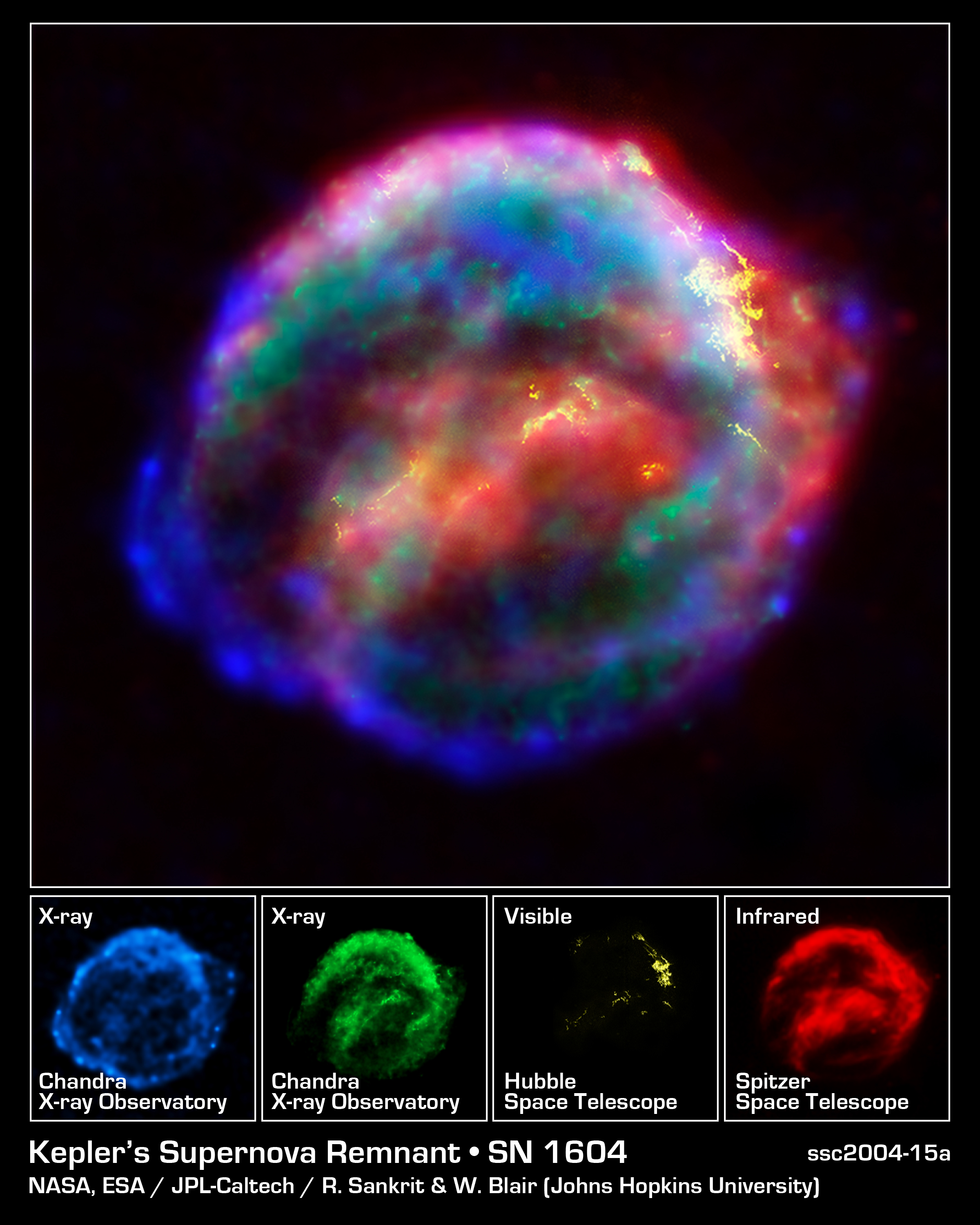
Kepler's Supernova observed in visible light, infrared, and X-rays by NASA's three Great Observatories

Performing astronomy from ground-based observatories on Earth is limited by the filtering and distortion of electromagnetic radiation (scintillation or twinkling) due to the atmosphere. A telescope orbiting Earth outside the atmosphere is subject neither to twinkling nor to light pollution from artificial light sources on Earth. As a result, the angular resolution of space telescopes is often much higher than a ground-based telescope with a similar aperture. Many larger terrestrial telescopes, however, reduce atmospheric effects with adaptive optics.

Space-based astronomy is more important for frequency ranges that are outside the optical window and the radio window, the only two wavelength ranges of the electromagnetic spectrum that are not severely attenuated by the atmosphere. Since the Earth's atmosphere blocks X-rays, and also largely blocks infrared and ultraviolet radiation, telescopes and observatories such as the Chandra X-ray Observatory, the James Webb Space Telescope, the XMM-Newton observatory and the (now deactivated) International Ultraviolet Explorer are stationed above the Earth's atmosphere.

Furthermore atmospheric refraction is proposed to be used as a lens in a so-called terrascope, or gravitational lensing for a telescope using the Solar gravitational lens, both approaches having the potential for extraordinary telescopic resolution.

== Disadvantages ==
Space telescopes are much more expensive to build than ground-based telescopes. Due to their location, space telescopes are also extremely difficult to maintain. The Hubble Space Telescope was serviced by the Space Shuttle, but most space telescopes cannot be serviced at all.

== Future of space observatories ==
Satellites have been launched and operated by NASA, ISRO, ESA, CNSA, JAXA and the Soviet space program (later succeeded by Roscosmos of Russia). As of 2022, many space observatories have already completed their missions, while others continue operating on extended time. However, the future availability of space telescopes and observatories depends on timely and sufficient funding. While future space observatories are planned by NASA, JAXA and the CNSA, scientists fear that there would be gaps in coverage that would not be covered immediately by future projects and this would affect research in fundamental science.

On 16 January 2023, NASA announced preliminary considerations of several future space telescope programs, including the Great Observatory Technology Maturation Program, Habitable Worlds Observatory, and New Great Observatories.

== See also ==
- Airborne observatory
- Balloon-borne telescope
- Earth observation satellite
- List of telescope types
- Timeline of artificial satellites and space probes
- Timeline of telescopes, observatories, and observing technology
- Ultraviolet astronomy
- X-ray telescope
- List of space telescopes
