= Slava Turyshev =

Russian physicist

- Scientific career
- Fields: Physics

Vyacheslav Gennadievich Turyshev (Russian: Вячеслав Геннадьевич Турышев) is a Russian physicist now working in the US at the NASA Jet Propulsion Laboratory (JPL). He is known for his investigations of the Pioneer anomaly, affecting Pioneer 10 and Pioneer 11 spacecraft, and for his attempt to recover early data of the Pioneer spacecraft to shed light on such a phenomenon.

== Education ==
Turyshev graduated from the Moscow State University Faculty of Physics in 1987, Department of Quantum Field Theory and High Energy Physics. In 1990, he earned Ph.D. in Astrophysics and Theoretical Gravity Physics from Moscow State University. In 2003, he got his MBA from UCLA Anderson School of Management. He later became Doctor of Astronomy, Astrophysics and Gravitational Physics from Moscow State University in 2008.

== Career ==
Following his graduation in 1987, he worked as a senior research fellow at Moscow State University. In 1993, Turyshev became a member of the NASA Jet Propulsion Laboratory (JPL). In 2012, he started working as Adjunct Professor, Department of Physics and Astronomy at UCLA. From January 2015 to December 2016, he was the leading researcher, then engineer of the Laboratory of Laser Interferometric Measurements of Moscow State University.

== Work ==
He is interested in:

- Science motivation, mission design, and data analysis of high-precision gravitational experiments in space.
- Relativistic cosmology and alternative theories of gravity; theory of gravity-wave astronomy, including wave generation, propagation and detection.
- Theory of and modeling for high-precision astronomical reference frames; lunar and interplanetary laser ranging; pulsar timing experiments.
- Optimization and control algorithms for long-baseline optical interferometry; analytical and numerical techniques for the white-light fringe parameter estimation.

He was the principal investigator of the LATOR mission aimed at testing parameterized post-Newtonian formalism with high accuracy. Dr. Turyshev chaired several workshops at the International Space Science Institute on the Pioneer anomaly and the flyby anomaly.

In 2020, Turyshev presented his idea of Direct Multi-pixel Imaging and Spectroscopy of an Exoplanet with a Solar Gravitational Lens Mission. The lens could reconstruct the exoplanet image with ~25 km-scale surface resolution in 6 months of integration time, enough to see surface features and signs of habitability. His proposal was selected for the Phase III of the NASA Innovative Advanced Concepts. Turyshev proposes to use realistic-sized solar sails (~16 vanes of 10^3 m^2) to achieve the needed high velocity at perihelion (~150 km/sec), reaching 547 AU in 17 years.

In 2023, a team of scientists led by Turychev proposed the Sundiver concept, whereby a solar sail craft can serve as a modular platform for various instruments and missions, including rendezvous with other Sundivers for resupply, in a variety of different self-sustaining orbits reaching velocities of ~5-10 AU/yr.

== Bibliometric information ==
As of November 2013, the h index of Turyshev, as released by the NASA ADS database, is 23, with more than 2000 non-self citations. His tori index and riq index are 25.8 and 267, respectively.
