= Pioneer anomaly =

Deviation in spacecraft deceleration

The Pioneer anomaly, or Pioneer effect, was the observed deviation from predicted accelerations of the Pioneer 10 and Pioneer 11 spacecraft after they passed about 20 astronomical units (3×10^{9} km; 2×10^{9} mi) on their trajectories out of the Solar System. The apparent anomaly was a matter of much interest for many years but has been subsequently explained by anisotropic radiation pressure caused by the spacecraft's heat loss.

Both Pioneer spacecraft are escaping the Solar System but are slowing under the influence of the Sun's gravity. Upon very close examination of navigational data, the spacecraft were found to be slowing slightly more than expected. The effect is an extremely small acceleration towards the Sun, of (8.74±1.33)×10^{−10} m/s^{2}, which is equivalent to a reduction of the outbound velocity by 1 km/h over a period of ten years. The two spacecraft were launched in 1972 and 1973. The anomalous acceleration was first noticed as early as 1980 but not seriously investigated until 1994. The last communication with either spacecraft was in 2003, but analysis of recorded data continues.

Various explanations, both of spacecraft behavior and of gravitation itself, were proposed to explain the anomaly. Over the period from 1998 to 2012, one particular explanation became accepted. The spacecraft, which are surrounded by an ultra-high vacuum and are each powered by a radioisotope thermoelectric generator (RTG), can shed heat only via thermal radiation. If, due to the design of the spacecraft, more heat is emitted in a particular direction by what is known as a radiative anisotropy, then the spacecraft would accelerate slightly in the direction opposite of the excess emitted radiation due to the recoil of thermal photons. If the excess radiation and attendant radiation pressure were pointed in a general direction opposite the Sun, the spacecraft's velocity away from the Sun would be decreasing at a rate greater than could be explained by previously recognized forces, such as gravity and trace friction due to the interplanetary medium (imperfect vacuum).

By 2012, several papers by different groups, all reanalyzing the thermal radiation pressure forces inherent in the spacecraft, showed that a careful accounting of this explains the entire anomaly; thus the cause is mundane and does not point to any new phenomenon or need to update the laws of physics. The most detailed analysis to date, by some of the original investigators, explicitly looks at two methods of estimating thermal forces, concluding that there is "no statistically significant difference between the two estimates and [...] that once the thermal recoil force is properly accounted for, no anomalous acceleration remains."

== Description ==
Pioneer 10 and 11 were sent on missions to Jupiter and Jupiter/Saturn, respectively. Both spacecraft were spin-stabilised in order to keep their high-gain antennas pointed towards Earth using gyroscopic forces. Although the spacecraft included thrusters, after the planetary encounters they were used only for semiannual conical scanning maneuvers to track Earth in its orbit, leaving them on a long "cruise" phase through the outer Solar System. During this period, both spacecraft were repeatedly contacted to obtain various measurements on their physical environment, providing valuable information long after their initial missions were complete.

Because the spacecraft were flying with almost no additional stabilization thrusts during their "cruise", it is possible to characterize the density of the solar medium by its effect on the spacecraft's motion. In the outer Solar System this effect would be easily calculable, based on ground-based measurements of the deep space environment. When these effects were taken into account, along with all other known effects, the calculated position of the Pioneers did not agree with measurements based on timing the return of the radio signals being sent back from the spacecraft. These consistently showed that both spacecraft were closer to the inner Solar System than they should be, by thousands of kilometres –small compared to their distance from the Sun, but nonetheless statistically significant. This apparent discrepancy grew over time as the measurements were repeated, suggesting that whatever was causing the anomaly was still acting on the spacecraft.

As the anomaly grew, it appeared that the spacecraft were moving more slowly than expected. Measurements of the spacecraft's speed using the Doppler effect demonstrated the same thing: the observed redshift was less than expected, which meant that the Pioneers had slowed down more than expected.

When all known forces acting on the spacecraft were taken into consideration, a very small but unexplained force remained. It appeared to cause an approximately constant sunward acceleration of (8.74±1.33)×10^{−10} m/s^{2} for both spacecraft. If the positions of the spacecraft were predicted one year in advance based on measured velocity and known forces (mostly gravity), they were actually found to be some 400 km closer to the sun at the end of the year. This anomaly is now believed to be accounted for by the spacecraft's innate thermal recoil forces.

== Explanation: thermal recoil force ==
Starting in 1998, there were suggestions that the thermal recoil force was underestimated, and perhaps could account for the entire anomaly. However, accurately accounting for thermal forces was hard, because it needed telemetry records of the spacecraft temperatures and a detailed thermal model, neither of which were available at the time. Furthermore, all thermal models predicted a decrease in the effect with time, which did not appear in the initial analysis.

One by one these objections were addressed. Many of the old telemetry records were found, and converted to modern formats. This gave power consumption figures and some temperatures for parts of the spacecraft. Several groups built detailed thermal models, which could be checked against the known temperatures and powers, and allowed a quantitative calculation of the recoil force. The longer span of navigational records showed the acceleration was in fact decreasing.

In July 2012, Slava Turyshev et al. published a paper in Physical Review Letters that explained the anomaly. The work explored the effect of the thermal recoil force on Pioneer 10, and concluded that "once the thermal recoil force is properly accounted for, no anomalous acceleration remains." Although the paper by Turyshev et al. has the most detailed analysis to date, the explanation based on thermal recoil force has the support of other independent research groups, using a variety of computational techniques. Examples include "thermal recoil pressure is not the cause of the Rosetta flyby anomaly but likely resolves the anomalous acceleration observed for Pioneer 10." and "It is shown that the whole anomalous acceleration can be explained by thermal effects".

== Indications from other missions ==
The Pioneers were uniquely suited to discover the effect because they have been flying for long periods of time without additional course corrections. Most deep-space probes launched after the Pioneers either stopped at one of the planets, or used thrusting throughout their mission.

The Voyagers flew a mission profile similar to the Pioneers, but were not spin stabilized. Instead, they required frequent firings of their thrusters for attitude control to stay aligned with Earth. Spacecraft like the Voyagers acquire small and unpredictable changes in speed as a side effect of the frequent attitude control firings. This 'noise' makes it impractical to measure small accelerations such as the Pioneer effect; accelerations as large as 10^{−9} m/s^{2} would be undetectable.

Newer spacecraft have used spin stabilization for some or all of their mission, including both Galileo and Ulysses. These spacecraft indicate a similar effect, although for various reasons (such as their relative proximity to the Sun) firm conclusions cannot be drawn from these sources. The Cassini mission has reaction wheels as well as thrusters for attitude control, and during cruise could rely for long periods on the reaction wheels alone, thus enabling precision measurements. It also had radioisotope thermoelectric generators (RTGs) mounted close to the spacecraft body, radiating kilowatts of heat in hard-to-predict directions.

After Cassini arrived at Saturn, it shed a large fraction of its mass from the fuel used in the insertion burn and the release of the Huygens probe. This increases the acceleration caused by the radiation forces because they are acting on less mass. This change in acceleration allows the radiation forces to be measured independently of any gravitational acceleration. Comparing cruise and Saturn-orbit results shows that for Cassini, almost all the unmodelled acceleration was due to radiation forces, with only a small residual acceleration, much smaller than the Pioneer acceleration, and with opposite sign.

The non-gravitational acceleration of the deep space probe New Horizons has been measured at about 1.25×10^{−9} m/s^{2} sunward, somewhat larger than the effect on Pioneer. Modelling of thermal effects indicates an expected sunward acceleration of 1.15×10^{−9} m/s^{2}, and given the uncertainties, the acceleration appears consistent with thermal radiation as the source of the non-gravitational forces measured. The measured acceleration is slowly decreasing as would be expected from the decreasing thermal output of the RTG.

== Potential issues with the thermal solution ==
There are two features of the anomaly, as originally reported, that are not addressed by the thermal solution: periodic variations in the anomaly, and the onset of the anomaly near the orbit of Saturn.

First, the anomaly has an apparent annual periodicity and an apparent Earth sidereal daily periodicity with amplitudes that are formally greater than the error budget. However, the same paper also states this problem is most likely not related to the anomaly: "The annual and diurnal terms are very likely different manifestations of the same modeling problem. [...] Such a modeling problem arises when there are errors in any of the parameters of the spacecraft orientation with respect to the chosen reference frame."

Second, the value of the anomaly measured over a period during and after the Pioneer 11 Saturn encounter had a relatively high uncertainty and a significantly lower value. The Turyshev, et al. 2012 paper compared the thermal analysis to the Pioneer 10 only. The Pioneer anomaly was unnoticed until after Pioneer 10 passed its Saturn encounter. However, the most recent analysis states: "Figure 2 is strongly suggestive that the previously reported "onset" of the Pioneer anomaly may in fact be a simple result of mis-modeling of the solar thermal contribution; this question may be resolved with further analysis of early trajectory data".

== Previously proposed explanations ==
Before the thermal recoil explanation became accepted, other proposed explanations fell into two classes –"mundane causes" or "new physics". Mundane causes include conventional effects that were overlooked or mis-modeled in the initial analysis, such as measurement error, thrust from gas leakage, or uneven heat radiation. The "new physics" explanations proposed revision of our understanding of gravitational physics.

If the Pioneer anomaly had been a gravitational effect due to some long-range modifications of the known laws of gravity, it did not affect the orbital motions of the major natural bodies in the same way (in particular those moving in the regions in which the Pioneer anomaly manifested itself in its presently known form). Hence a gravitational explanation would need to violate the equivalence principle, which states that all objects are affected the same way by gravity. It was therefore argued that increasingly accurate measurements and modelling of the motions of the outer planets and their satellites undermined the possibility that the Pioneer anomaly is a phenomenon of gravitational origin. However, others believed that our knowledge of the motions of the outer planets and dwarf planet Pluto was still insufficient to disprove the gravitational nature of the Pioneer anomaly. The same authors ruled out the existence of a gravitational Pioneer-type extra-acceleration in the outskirts of the Solar System by using a sample of Trans-Neptunian objects.

The magnitude of the Pioneer effect $a_p$ ((8.74±1.33)×10^{−10} m/s^{2}) is numerically quite close to the product ((6.59±0.07)×10^{−10} m/s^{2}) of the speed of light $c$ and the Hubble constant $H_0$, hinting at a cosmological connection, but this is now believed to be of no particular significance. In fact the latest Jet Propulsion Laboratory review (2010) undertaken by Turyshev and Toth claims to rule out the cosmological connection by considering rather conventional sources whereas other scientists provided a disproof based on the physical implications of cosmological models themselves.

Gravitationally bound objects such as the Solar System, or even the Milky Way, are not supposed to partake of the expansion of the universe—this is known both from conventional theory and by direct measurement. This does not necessarily interfere with paths new physics can take with drag effects from planetary secular accelerations of possible cosmological origin.

=== Deceleration model ===
It has been viewed as possible that a real deceleration is not accounted for in the current model for several reasons.

==== Gravity ====
It is possible that deceleration is caused by gravitational forces from unidentified sources such as the Kuiper belt or dark matter. However, this acceleration does not show up in the orbits of the outer planets, so any generic gravitational answer would need to violate the equivalence principle (see modified inertia below). Likewise, the anomaly does not appear in the orbits of Neptune's moons, challenging the possibility that the Pioneer anomaly may be an unconventional gravitational phenomenon based on range from the Sun.

==== Drag ====
The cause could be drag from the interplanetary medium, including dust, solar wind and cosmic rays. However, the measured densities are too small to cause the effect.

==== Gas leaks ====
Gas leaks, including helium from the spacecraft's radioisotope thermoelectric generators (RTGs) have been thought of as a possible cause.

=== Observational or recording errors ===
The possibility of observational errors, which include measurement and computational errors, has been advanced as a reason for interpreting the data as an anomaly. Hence, this would result in approximation and statistical errors. However, further analysis has determined that significant errors are not likely because seven independent analyses have shown the existence of the Pioneer anomaly as of March 2010.

The effect is so small that it could be a statistical anomaly caused by differences in the way data were collected over the lifetime of the probes. Numerous changes were made over this period, including changes in the receiving instruments, reception sites, data recording systems and recording formats.

=== New physics ===
Because the "Pioneer anomaly" does not show up as an effect on the planets, Anderson et al. speculated that this would be interesting if this was new physics. Later, with the Doppler shifted signal confirmed, the team again speculated that one explanation may lie with new physics, if not some unknown systemic explanation.

==== Clock acceleration ====
Clock acceleration was an alternate explanation to anomalous acceleration of the spacecraft towards the Sun. This theory took notice of an expanding universe, which was thought to create an increasing background 'gravitational potential'. The increased gravitational potential would then accelerate cosmological time. It was proposed that this particular effect causes the observed deviation from predicted trajectories and velocities of Pioneer 10 and Pioneer 11.

From their data, Anderson's team deduced a steady frequency drift of 1.5 Hz over eight years. This could be mapped on to a clock acceleration theory, which meant all clocks would be changing in relation to a constant acceleration: in other words, that there would be a non-uniformity of time. Moreover, for such a distortion related to time, Anderson's team reviewed several models in which time distortion as a phenomenon is considered. They arrived at the "clock acceleration" model after completion of the review. Although the best model adds a quadratic term to defined International Atomic Time, the team encountered problems with this theory. This then led to non-uniform time in relation to a constant acceleration as the most likely theory. (Note: non-uniform time in relation to a constant acceleration is a summarized term derived from the source or sources used for this sub-section.)

==== Definition of gravity modified ====
The Modified Newtonian dynamics or MOND hypothesis proposed that the force of gravity deviates from the traditional Newtonian value to a very different force law at very low accelerations on the order of 10^{−10} m/s^{2}. Given the low accelerations placed on the spacecraft while in the outer Solar System, MOND may be in effect, modifying the normal gravitational equations. The Lunar Laser Ranging experiment combined with data of LAGEOS satellites refutes that simple gravity modification is the cause of the Pioneer anomaly. The precession of the longitudes of perihelia of the solar planets or the trajectories of long-period comets have not been reported to experience an anomalous gravitational field toward the Sun of the magnitude capable of describing the Pioneer anomaly.

==== Definition of inertia modified ====
MOND can also be interpreted as a modification of inertia, perhaps due to an interaction with vacuum energy, and such a trajectory-dependent theory could account for the different accelerations apparently acting on the orbiting planets and the Pioneer craft on their escape trajectories. A possible terrestrial test for evidence of a different model of modified inertia has also been proposed.

==== Parametric time ====
Another theoretical explanation was based on a possible non-equivalence of the atomic time and the astronomical time, which could give the same observational fingerprint as the anomaly.

==== Celestial ephemerides in an expanding universe ====
Another proposed explanation of Pioneer anomaly is that the background spacetime is described by a cosmological Friedmann–Lemaître–Robertson–Walker metric that is not Minkowski flat. In this model of spacetime manifold, light moves uniformly with respect to the conformal cosmological time whereas physical measurements are performed with the help of atomic clocks that count the proper time of observer coinciding with the cosmic time. This difference yields exactly the same numerical value and signature of the Doppler shift measured in the Pioneer experiment. However, this explanation requires the thermal effects be a small percentage of the total, in contradiction to the many studies that estimate it to be the bulk of the effect.

== Further research avenues ==
It is possible, but not proven, that this anomaly is linked to the flyby anomaly, which has been observed in other spacecraft. Although the circumstances are very different (planet flyby vis-à-vis deep space cruise), the overall effect is similar—a small but unexplained velocity change is observed on top of a much larger conventional gravitational acceleration.

The Pioneer spacecraft are no longer providing new data (the last contact was on 23 January 2003) and other deep-space missions that might be studied (Galileo and Cassini) were deliberately disposed of in the atmospheres of Jupiter and Saturn, respectively. This leaves several remaining options for further research:

- Further analysis of the retrieved Pioneer data. This includes not only the data that was first used to detect the anomaly, but additional data that until recently was saved only in older, inaccessible computer formats and media. This data was recovered in 2006, converted to more modern formats, and is now available for analysis.
- The New Horizons spacecraft to Pluto is spin-stabilised for long intervals, and there were proposals to use it to investigate the anomaly. It was known that New Horizons would have the same problem that precluded good data from the cruise portion of Cassini mission, namely that its RTG is mounted close to the spacecraft body. (Thermal radiation from it, bouncing off the spacecraft, would produce a systematic thrust of a not-easily predicted magnitude as large or larger than the original Pioneer effect). However, it was hoped that despite any large systematic bias from the RTG, the 'onset' of the anomaly at or near the orbit of Saturn might be observed.
- A dedicated mission has also been proposed. Such a mission would probably need to surpass 200 AU from the Sun in a hyperbolic escape orbit.
- Observations of asteroids around 20 AU may provide insights if the anomaly's cause is gravitational.

== Meetings and conferences about the anomaly ==
A meeting was held at the University of Bremen in 2004 to discuss the Pioneer anomaly.

The Pioneer Explorer Collaboration was formed to study the Pioneer Anomaly and has hosted three meetings (2005, 2007, and 2008) at International Space Science Institute in Bern, Switzerland, to discuss the anomaly, and discuss possible means for resolving the source.

== See also ==
- Flyby anomaly
