= Terrascope =

Terrascope may refer to:

- Ptolemaic Terrascope, a music magazine
- Terrestrial atmospheric lens, a hypothetical method for creating a telescope
