= FOCAL (spacecraft) =

Proposed space telescope

FOCAL (an acronym for Fast Outgoing Cyclopean Astronomical Lens) is a proposed space telescope that would use the Sun as a gravity lens. The gravitational lens effect was first derived by Albert Einstein, and the concept of a mission to the solar gravitational lens was first suggested by professor Von R. Eshleman, and analyzed further by Italian astronomer Claudio Maccone and others.

In order to use the Sun as a gravity lens, it would be necessary to send the telescope to a minimum distance of 550 astronomical units away from the Sun, enabling very high signal amplifications: for example, at the 203 GHz frequency (i.e, ~15mm wavelength), amplification of 1.3·10^{15}. Maccone suggests that this should be enough to obtain detailed images of the surfaces of extrasolar planets.

== Other uses of the mission ==
Even without using the Sun as the lens, FOCAL could perform various, otherwise impossible measurements: a separate telescope could be used to measure stellar distances by parallax, which would, using the baseline of 550 AU, measure the precise position of every star in the Milky Way, enabling various further scientific discoveries. It could also study the interstellar medium, the heliosphere, observe gravitational waves, check for the possible variation of the gravitational constant, observe the cosmic infrared background, characterise interplanetary dust within the Solar System, more precisely measure the mass of the Solar System and similar.

== Limitations ==
FOCAL does not require any non-existing technology; however, it has various limitations. A space mission of this duration and distance has never been attempted; for comparison, the Voyager 1 and Voyager 2 probes are at distances of 171 AU and 142 AU in 2026. A gravity lens will bend objects behind it, so that images from the telescope would be difficult to interpret. FOCAL would be able to observe only objects that are right behind the Sun from its point of view, which means that for every observed object a new telescope would have to be made.

A critique of the technology of the gravity lens telescope was given by Geoffrey Landis. Some of the problems Landis points out include discussion of the interference of the solar corona, which will make the telescope signal-to-noise ratio poor, the high magnification of the target, which will make the design of the mission focal plane difficult, and an analysis of the inherent spherical aberration of the lens will limit the resolution possible.
