= 307 Nike =

Main-belt asteroid

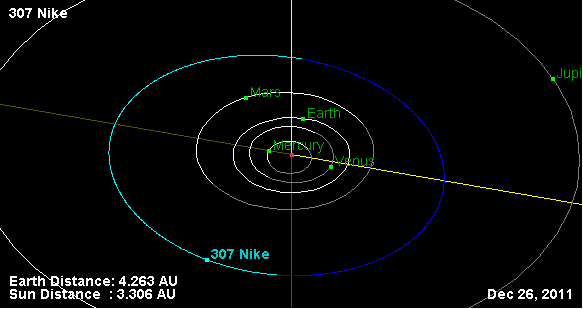
- Orbital diagram

Discovery
- Discovered by: Auguste Charlois
- Discovery site: Nice
- Discovery date: 5 March 1891

Designations
- Pronunciation: /ˈnaɪkiː/
- Named after: Nike
- Alternative designations: A891 EB; 1957 LM
- Minor planet category: Main belt

Orbital characteristics
- Epoch 31 July 2016 (JD 2457600.5)
- Uncertainty parameter 0
- Observation arc: 125.12 yr (45699 d)
- Aphelion: 3.3226 AU (497.05 Gm)
- Perihelion: 2.4899 AU (372.48 Gm)
- Semi-major axis: 2.9063 AU (434.78 Gm)
- Eccentricity: 0.14327
- Orbital period (sidereal): 4.95 yr (1809.7 d)
- Mean anomaly: 170.550°
- Mean motion: 0° 11^{m} 56.148^{s} / day
- Inclination: 6.1260°
- Longitude of ascending node: 100.966°
- Argument of perihelion: 324.764°

Physical characteristics
- Dimensions: 54.96±3.3 km
- Synodic rotation period: 11.857 ± 0.001 h (0.494042 ± 4.2×10^{−5} d); 7.902 ± 0.005 h
- Geometric albedo: 0.0524±0.007
- Spectral type: C
- Absolute magnitude (H): 10.12

307 Nike is a sizeable asteroid of the asteroid belt. It was discovered by the French astronomer Auguste Charlois on 5 March 1891 while working at the Nice Observatory. Charlois named it after the Greek goddess of victory, as well as the Greek name for the city where it was discovered.

This object is orbiting the Sun at a distance of 2.91 AU with an eccentricity of 0.14 with an orbital period of 4.95 years. The orbital plane is inclined at an angle of 6.13° relative to the plane of the ecliptic. It is classified as a carbon-rich C-type asteroid. Infrared measurements yield a diameter of 55 km.

Measurement of the light curve of this asteroid in 2000 indicates a rotation period of 7.902 ± 0.005 hours. A 2016 study revised the rotation period to 11.857±0.001 hours with a brightness variation of 0.20±0.02 in magnitude.

On 2 December 1972, Pioneer 10 made one of its nearest passages of an asteroid when it passed 307 Nike at a distance of about 8.8 million kilometers (0.059 AU) during the spacecraft's pioneering trip through the asteroid belt. No data was collected.
