= Claudio Maccone =

Italian astronomer (1948–2025)

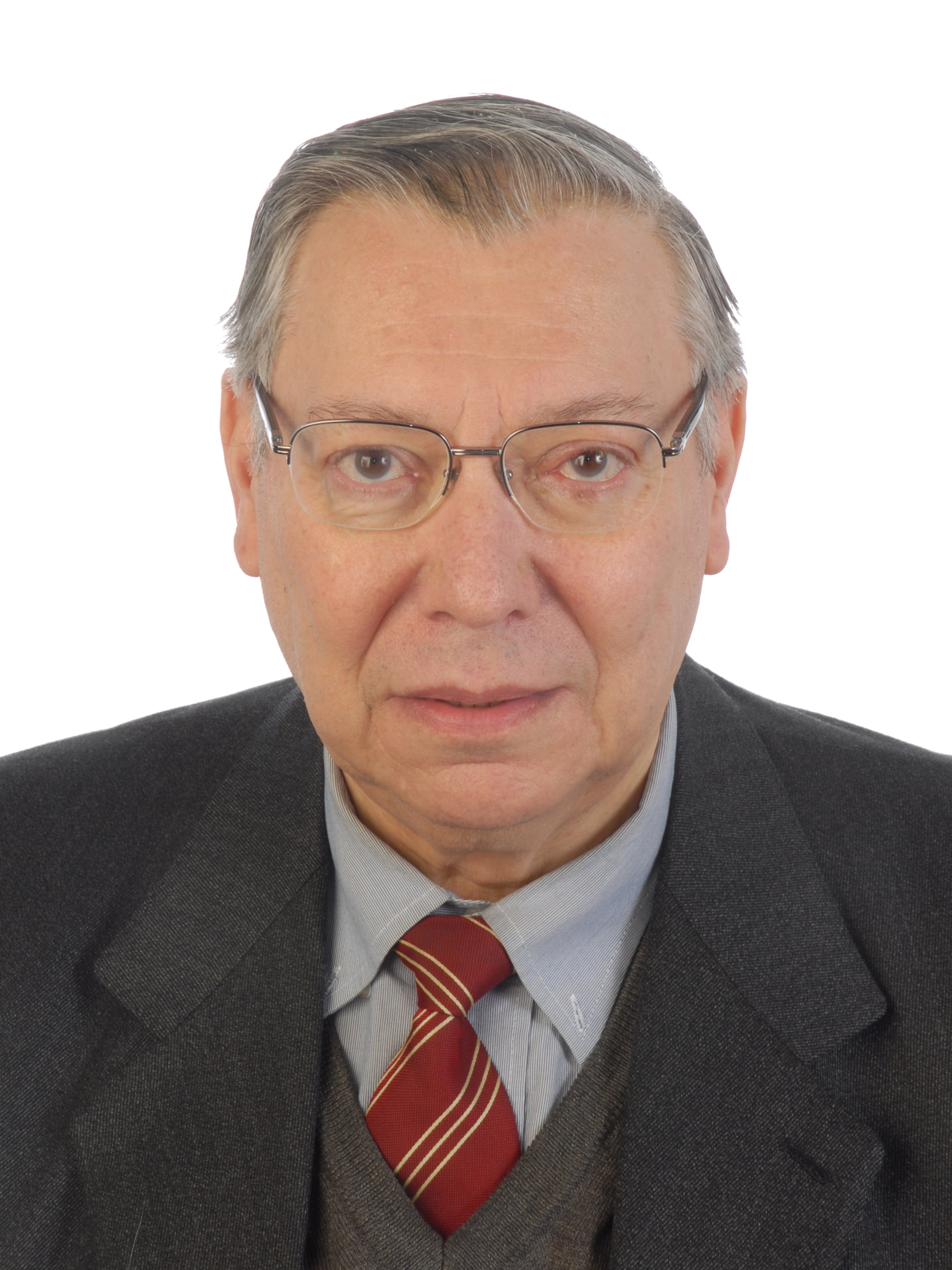
- Born: 6 February 1948; Turin, Italy
- Died: 20 August 2025 (aged 77); Turin, Italy
- Education: King's College London
- Occupations: SETI astronomer; space scientist; mathematician
- Awards: Giordano Bruno Award

Claudio Maccone (6 February 1948 – 20 August 2025) was an Italian SETI astronomer, space scientist and mathematician.

== Life and career ==
Maccone was born on 6 February 1948. He obtained two degrees from the University of Turin: in physics in 1972 and in mathematics in 1974. He obtained his PhD at the Department of mathematics of King's College London, England in September 1980.

In 1985 he briefly held a position as "Professore di ruolo" in Mathematics at "Liceo Scientifico Albert Einstein" in Turin.

He then joined the Space Systems Group of Aeritalia (later called Alenia Spazio S.p.A. and now Thales Alenia Space Italia S.p.A.) in Turin on 19 September 1985, and immediately got involved in the design of new space missions.

In 2002 he was awarded the "Giordano Bruno Award" by the SETI League, "for his efforts to establish a radio observatory on the far side of the Moon."

After his early retirement from Alenia Spazio S.p.A. on 30 December 2004, he taught at Polytechnic University of Turin for five years (2005-2009) at Post-Doctoral level. He was Advisor to Ph.D. candidates in the Aerospace and Electronics Departments of Polytechnic University of Turin.

Since 2010 he was the Director for Scientific Space Exploration of the International Academy of Astronautics (IAA, based in Paris, France).

From 2012 to 2021, he served as Chair of the IAA SETI Permanent Committee.

He had published 149 scientific and technical papers.

Maccone died of a heart attack on 20 August 2025, at the age of 77.

== Books ==
- 1994 Telecommunications, KLT and Relativity, IPI Press, Colorado Springs, USA
- 1998 The Sun as a Gravitational Lens: Proposed Space Missions, IPI Press, Colorado Springs, USA (proposing FOCAL space telescope), IAA Book Award 1999
- 2009 Deep Space Flight and Communications – Exploiting the Sun as a Gravitational Lens, Praxis-Springer The book was translated into Chinese by 2014 and awarded the IAA Book Award in 2018
- 2012 Mathematical SETI - Statistics, Signal Processing, Space Missions
- 2021 Evo-SETI – Life Evolution Statistics on Earth and Exoplanets. It won the Mathematical Astrobiology, IAA Book Award 2022.
- 2024 The Living Galaxy, co-authored with Eugenio Mieli and Andrea M. F. Valli

== Honours and awards ==
- The central main-belt binary asteroid 11264 Claudiomaccone was named in Maccone's honor
- Maccone was a member of the International Astronomical Union (IAU) and an Associate of “Istituto Nazionale di Astrofisica (INAF)” in Italy.
- Since December 2021 Maccone was serving as Chair of the IAA Moon Farside Protection Permanent Committee. His Co-chair is Prof. Jack O. Burns (University of Colorado at Boulder).
- On 8 February 2024, Maccone gave his third speech at the United Nations COPUOS in Vienna about the Moon Farside Protection.
- On 21–22 March 2024, Maccone and co-workers run the First IAA Symposium on Moon Farside Protection in Turin
