= Solar gravitational lens =

Concept of using the Sun as a large lens

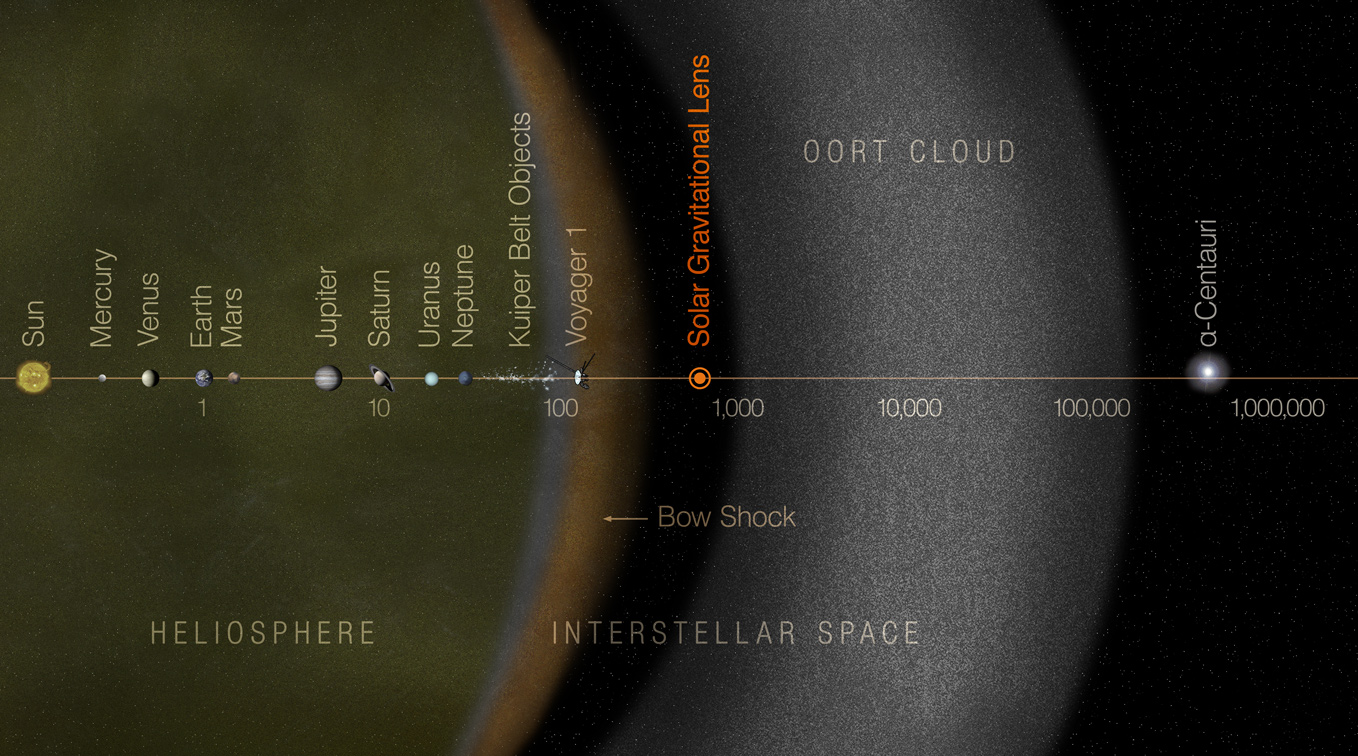
Solar gravitational lens point, on a logarithmic scale

A solar gravitational lens or solar gravity lens (SGL) is a theoretical method of using the Sun as a large lens with a physical effect called gravitational lensing. It is considered one of the best methods to directly image habitable exoplanets.

== History ==
The solar gravitational lens is characterized by remarkable properties: it offers brightness amplification of up to a factor of ~10^{11} (at 1 μm) and extreme angular resolution (~10^{−10} arcsec).

Albert Einstein predicted in 1936 that rays of light from the same direction that skirt the edges of the Sun would converge to a focal point approximately 542 AUs from the Sun. A probe positioned at this distance from the Sun could use it as a gravitational lens for magnifying distant objects on the opposite side of the Sun. The probe's location could shift around as needed to select different targets relative to the Sun. In 1979, Von R. Eshleman was the first author proposing to use the Sun as a large lens.

The Sun's gravitational field bends light more prominently the closer it gets to the Sun. Light rays passing on opposite sides of the Sun meet at a focal point, forming a series of points along a line that extends from the star through the Sun's center. With the solar corona having an active and dynamic atmosphere, the beams of light passing close to the Sun are affected by the particles of the atmosphere.

A probe called SETIsail and later FOCAL was proposed to the ESA in 1993, but is expected to be a difficult task. If a probe does pass 542 AU, magnification capabilities of the lens will continue to act at farther distances, as the rays that come to a focus at larger distances pass further away from the distortions of the Sun's corona.

In 2020, NASA physicist Slava Turyshev presented his idea of direct multi-pixel imaging and spectroscopy of an exoplanet with a solar gravitational lens mission. The lens could reconstruct the image of an exoplanet 30 pc (98 ly) away with ~25 km-scale surface resolution in 6 months of integration time, enough to see surface features and signs of habitability. His proposal was selected for the Phase III of the NIAC 2020 (NASA Institute for Advanced Concepts). Turyshev proposes to use realistic-sized solar sails (~16 vanes of 10^{3} m^{2}) to achieve the needed high velocity at perihelion (~150 km/sec), reaching 547 AU in 17 years.

== See also ==
- Einstein ring
- Terrestrial atmospheric lens, another hypothetical, extremely high resolution space telescope, using Earth's atmosphere as a refractive lens
