= 11264 Claudiomaccone =

Stony background asteroid and binary system

Discovery
- Discovered by: N. Chernykh
- Discovery site: Crimean Astrophysical Obs.
- Discovery date: 16 October 1979

Designations
- Named after: Claudio Maccone (Italian astronomer)
- Alternative designations: 1979 UC_{4} · 1989 EC_{10} 1991 PD_{14}
- Minor planet category: main-belt · ((central)) background

Orbital characteristics
- Epoch 4 September 2017 (JD 2458000.5)
- Uncertainty parameter 0
- Observation arc: 66.27 yr (24,204 days)
- Aphelion: 3.1793 AU
- Perihelion: 1.9775 AU
- Semi-major axis: 2.5784 AU
- Eccentricity: 0.2331
- Orbital period (sidereal): 4.14 yr (1,512 days)
- Mean anomaly: 21.409°
- Mean motion: 0° 14^{m} 17.16^{s} / day
- Inclination: 3.5229°
- Longitude of ascending node: 11.129°
- Argument of perihelion: 57.936°
- Known satellites: 1

Physical characteristics
- Dimensions: 3.203±0.295 km 4.30 km (calculated)
- Synodic rotation period: 3.18701±0.00005 h 3.1872±0.0006 h 3.1872 h 3.1873±0.0001 h
- Geometric albedo: 0.20 (assumed); 0.432±0.094
- Spectral type: V–R = 0.520±0.035; S · S/Q
- Absolute magnitude (H): 14.0 · 14.2 · 14.3 · 14.44±0.25

11264 Claudiomaccone (provisional designation 1979 UC_{4}) is a stony background asteroid and binary system from the middle regions of the asteroid belt, approximately 3 kilometers in diameter. It was discovered 16 October 1979, by Nikolai Chernykh at Crimean Astrophysical Observatory in Nauchnyj, on the Crimean peninsula. It was named after the Italian astronomer Claudio Maccone.

== Orbit and classification ==
Claudiomaccone orbits the Sun in the (central) main-belt at a distance of 2.0–3.2 AU once every 4 years and 2 months (1,512 days). Its orbit has an eccentricity of 0.23 and an inclination of 4° with respect to the ecliptic. Claudiomaccone comes closer to Mars than to the other planets, repeatedly approaching the Red Planet as close as 0.47 AU (70,300,000 km). In 2096 it makes a very rare approach to 65,000,000 km.

A first precovery was taken at Palomar Observatory in 1950, extending the body's observation arc by 29 years prior to its official discovery observation.

== Physical characteristics ==
=== Diameter and albedo ===
According to the survey carried out by NASA's Wide-field Infrared Survey Explorer with its subsequent NEOWISE mission, Claudiomaccone measures 3.203 kilometers in diameter and its surface has a high albedo of 0.432, while the Collaborative Asteroid Lightcurve Link assumes a standard albedo for stony S-type asteroids of 0.20 and calculates a diameter of 4.30 kilometers with an absolute magnitude of 14.2.

=== Photometry ===
In November 2004, a rotational lightcurve of Claudiomaccone was obtained from photometric observations by Ukrainian astronomer Yurij N. Krugly, using the 0.7-meter telescope at Chuguev Observation Station (121) and the 1-meter telescope at Simeiz Observatory. Lightcurve analysis gave a rotation period of 3.1872 hours with a brightness amplitude of 0.15 magnitude (U=n.a.). An identical period with an amplitude of 0.12 magnitude, was also published by Petr Pravec in 2006.

After the binary nature of Claudiomaccone was announced (see below), follow-up observations by a group of French, Swiss and Italian astronomers (including Claudio Maccone) in 2008 and 2012, gave a period 3.1873 and 3.18701 hours with an amplitude of 0.16 and 0.12 magnitude, respectively (U=2/2+).

=== Satellite ===
The obtained photometric observations from 2004, also revealed that Claudiomaccone is an asynchronous binary system with a minor-planet moon orbiting it every 15.11 hours. An identical orbital period is also given by Pravec. The discovery was announced in December 2005

Based on a secondary to primary mean-diameter ratio of larger than 0.31, the moon's diameter is estimated to be at least 1.24 kilometers. Its orbit around Claudiomaccone has an estimated semi-major axis of 6 kilometers.

== Naming ==
This minor planet was named after Claudio Maccone (born 1948), an Italian SETI astronomer and space scientist at Thales Alenia Space in Turin, Italy. In his book The Sun as a Gravitational Lens: Proposed Space Missions he proposed the construction and launch of a spacecraft–antenna, called the FOCAL space mission. Outside the Solar System, at a distance of 550 AU, FOCAL could have a significantly better sensitivity detecting radio signals due to the Sun's magnifying gravitational lensing effect, as predicted by general relativity. The official naming citation was published on 2 September 2001 (M.P.C. 43382; 54279 and *35557). In 2012, he succeed American astronomer Seth Shostak as chairman of the SETI Permanent Committee at the International Academy of Astronautics.
