= Von R. Eshleman =

American radio astronomer (1924–2017)

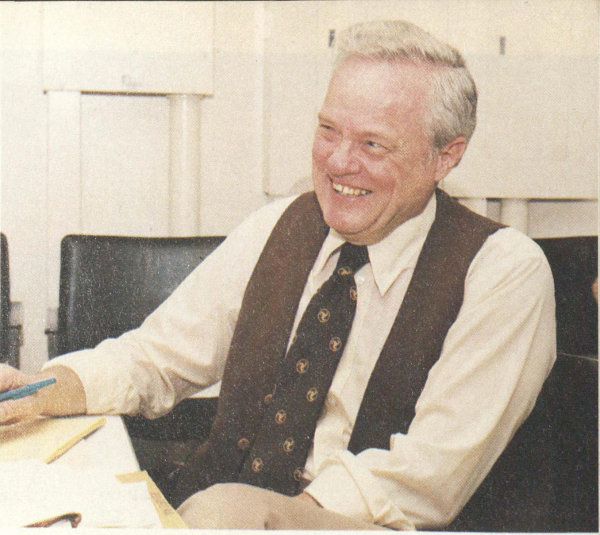
- Eshleman in c. 1980
- Born: September 17, 1924; Covington, Ohio
- Died: September 22, 2017 (aged 92); Palo Alto, California
- Education: George Washington University (BSc 1949); Stanford University (MSc 1950, PhD 1952)
- Scientific career
- Fields: radio astronomy
- Workplaces: Stanford University
- Thesis: The mechanism of radio reflections from meteoric ionization (1952)
- Doctoral advisors: Oswald Garrison Villard Jr. and Laurence Albert Manning

Von Russel Eshleman (1924–2017) was an American radio astronomer.

== Biography ==
Eshleman was born on September 17, 1924, in Covington, Ohio. His family was of Old German Baptist Brethren ancestry; he was the youngest of four sons. During the war, Eshleman served in the US Navy as an electronics technician (1943–1946). While in the Navy, he became interested in astronomy, thinking about "bouncing radio signals from the lunar surface". He unsuccessfully tried to do it using the ship's radar.

After the war, Eshleman studied at the General Motors Institute of Technology, Ohio State University and the George Washington University. He received his BSc in electrical engineering from the latter in 1949. He get his MSc (1950) and PhD (1952) from Stanford University. His thesis was on "radio reflections from ionized meteor trails in the upper Earth's atmosphere", advised by Oswald Garrison Villard Jr. and Laurence Albert Manning. Eshleman was supported by both Office of Naval Research and Air Force. The Air Force was mainly interested in Eshleman's idea to use meteor ionization trails as a secure communication channel. He then became a researcher at Stanford, promoted to assistant professor in 1957 and to full professor in 1962. In the same year, he cofounded the Stanford Center for Radar Astronomy which performed radio science experiments with Pioneer 6, 7, 8, and 9 spacecraft. In 1959, Eshleman "recorded the first distinguishable echo of a radar signal bounced off the sun".

He then switched to planetary exploration using radio science experiments. Eshleman became the PI of Radio Science Experiment for the twin Voyager program spacecraft, sent to the outer solar system. After Voyager, Eshleman worked on "evolute flashes during deep radio occultations, stellar gravitational lenses and their effects on propagating radio waves, ring particle dynamics, absorption in planetary atmospheres ... and retro-reflection from icy planetary surfaces."

In 1979, Eshleman became the first who propose to use the Sun as a gravitational lens.

Eshleman authored more than a hundred articles.

== Awards and recognition ==
- Member of the Academy of Engineering
- Fellow of the IEEE
- Fellow of the American Astronomical Society
- NASA Exceptional Scientific Achievement Medal (1981)

== Personal life ==
Eshleman met his future wife, Patricia Middleton, in Stanford. They married in 1947 and had four children.

Eshleman retired in 1992. He died on September 22, 2017, in Palo Alto, California, at 93.

== Selected publications ==
- Kliore, Arvydas; Cain, Dan L.; Levy, Gerald S.; Eshleman, Von R.; Fjeldbo, Gunnar; Drake, Frank D. (10 September 1965). "Occultation Experiment: Results of the First Direct Measurement of Mars's Atmosphere and Ionosphere". Science. 149 (3689): 1243–1248. Bibcode:1965Sci...149.1243K. doi:10.1126/science.149.3689.1243. PMID 17747455.
- Fjeldbo, Gunnar; Fjeldbo, Wencke C.; Eshleman, Von R. (1966). "Models for the atmosphere of Mars based on the Mariner 4 Occultation Experiment". Journal of Geophysical Research. 71 (9): 2307–2316. Bibcode:1966JGR....71.2307F. doi:10.1029/JZ071i009p02307. ISSN 2156-2202.
- Fjeldbo, Gunnar; Eshleman, Von R. (1 August 1968). "The atmosphere of mars analyzed by integral inversion of the Mariner IV occultation data". Planetary and Space Science. 16 (8): 1035–1059. Bibcode:1968P&SS...16.1035F. doi:10.1016/0032-0633(68)90020-2. ISSN 0032-0633.
- Fjeldbo, G.; Kliore, A. J.; Eshleman, V. R. (1971). "The Neutral Atmosphere of Venus as Studied with the Mariner V Radio Occultation Experiments". Astronomical Journal. 76: 123. Bibcode:1971AJ.....76..123F. doi:10.1086/111096.
- Eshleman, Von R. (1 September 1973). "The radio occultation method for the study of planetary atmospheres". Planetary and Space Science. 21 (9): 1521–1531. Bibcode:1973P&SS...21.1521E. doi:10.1016/0032-0633(73)90059-7. ISSN 0032-0633.
- Eshleman, Von R. (14 September 1979). "Gravitational Lens of the Sun: Its Potential for Observations and Communications over Interstellar Distances". Science. 205 (4411): 1133–1135. Bibcode:1979Sci...205.1133E. doi:10.1126/science.205.4411.1133. PMID 17735051.
- Marouf, Essam A.; Leonard Tyler, G.; Zebker, Howard A.; Simpson, Richard A.; Eshleman, Von R. (1 May 1983). "Particle size distributions in Saturn's rings from voyager 1 radio occultation". Icarus. 54 (2): 189–211. Bibcode:1983Icar...54..189M. doi:10.1016/0019-1035(83)90192-6. ISSN 0019-1035.
- Tyler, G. Leonard; Marouf, Essam A.; Simpson, Richard A.; Zebker, Howard A.; Eshleman, Von R. (1 May 1983). "The microwave opacity of Saturn's rings at wavelengths of 3.6 and 13 cm from Voyager 1 radio occultation". Icarus. 54 (2): 160–188. Bibcode:1983Icar...54..160T. doi:10.1016/0019-1035(83)90191-4. ISSN 0019-1035.
