= Pioneer 10 =

First spacecraft to visit Jupiter and the outer Solar System (1972–2003)

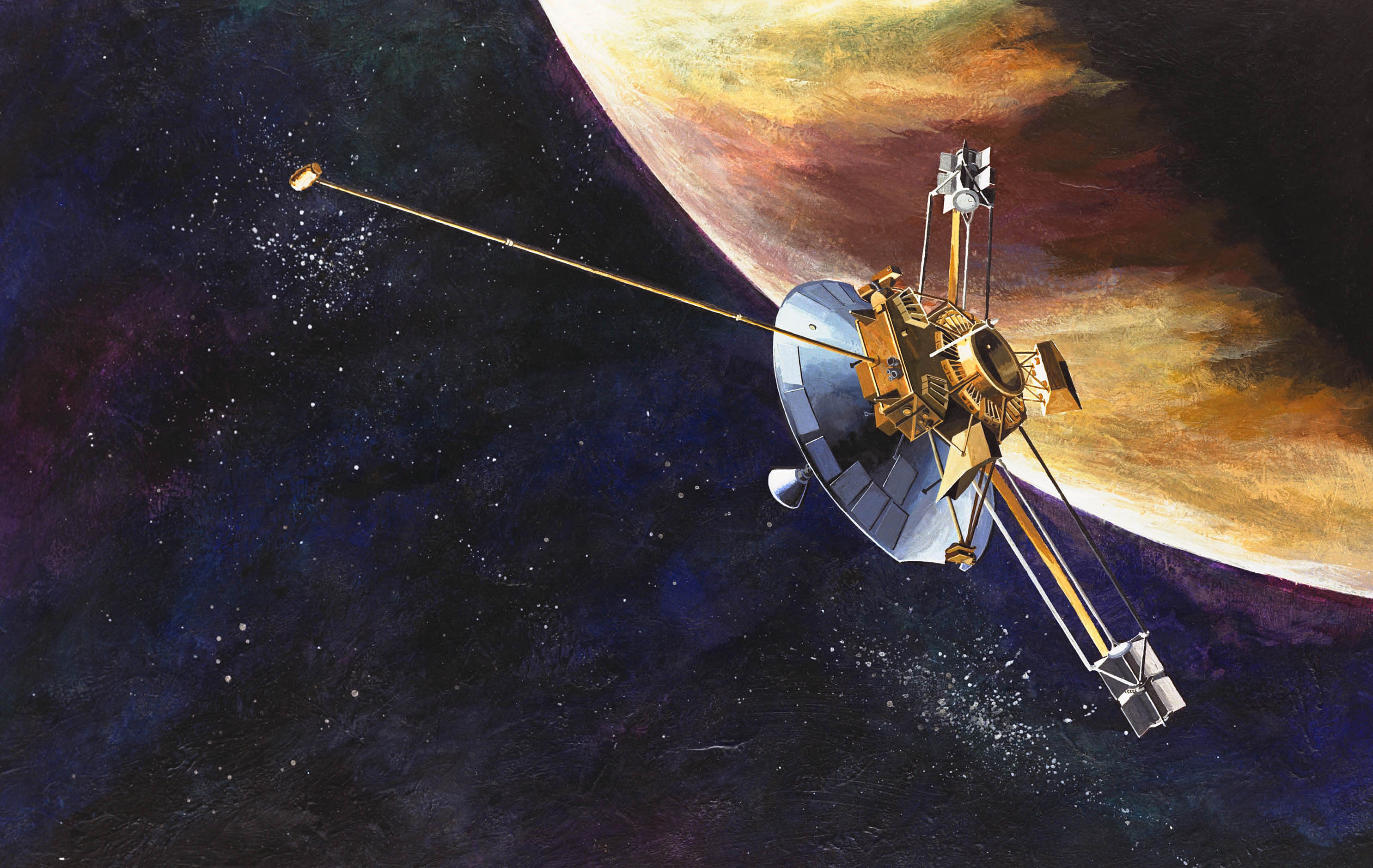
- Artist's conception of Pioneer 10 passing Jupiter
- Mission type: Planetary / Heliosphere exploration
- Operator: NASA / Ames
- COSPAR ID: 1972-012A
- SATCAT no.: 5860
- Website: science.nasa.gov
- Mission duration: 30 years, 10 months and 21 days

Spacecraft properties
- Spacecraft: Pioneer F
- Manufacturer: TRW
- Launch mass: 258 kg
- Power: 155 watts (at launch)

Start of mission
- Launch date: March 3, 1972, 01:49:04 UTC
- Rocket: Atlas SLV-3C Centaur-D; Star-37E
- Launch site: Cape Canaveral LC-36A

End of mission
- Disposal: Decommissioned
- Declared: March 31, 1997
- Last contact: April 27, 2002; Last telemetry January 23, 2003; Last signal received

Flyby of Jupiter
- Closest approach: December 3, 1973
- Distance: 132,252 km (82,178 mi)
Instruments
- HMV: Helium Vector Magnetometer
- -: Quadrispherical Plasma Analyzer
- CPI: Charged Particle Instrument
- CRT: Cosmic Ray Telescope
- GTT: Geiger Tube Telescope
- TRD: Trapped Radiation Detector
- -: Meteoroid Detectors
- AMD: Asteroid/Meteoroid Detector
- -: Ultraviolet Photometer
- IPP: Imaging Photopolarimeter
- -: Infrared Radiometer
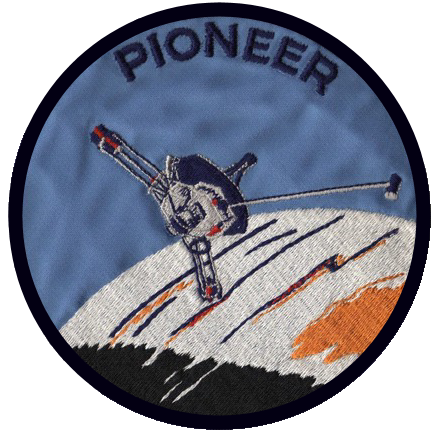
- Pioneer program

Pioneer 10 (originally designated Pioneer F) is a space probe launched by NASA in 1972 that completed the first mission to the planet Jupiter. It was the first spacecraft to traverse the asteroid belt and the first of five artificial objects to achieve the escape velocity needed to leave the Solar System. The mission was managed by NASA Ames Research Center in California, and the spacecraft was built by TRW Inc.

The spacecraft was built around a hexagonal satellite bus with a 2.74 m (9.0 ft) diameter parabolic high-gain antenna and was spin-stabilized about the antenna axis. Electrical power was supplied by four radioisotope thermoelectric generators (RTGs), which produced a combined 155 watts at launch.

Pioneer 10 was launched on March 3, 1972, at 01:49:00 UTC (March 2 local time), aboard an Atlas-Centaur rocket from Cape Canaveral Launch Complex 36A. It passed through the asteroid belt from July 15, 1972 to February 15, 1973, becoming the first spacecraft to do so. Imaging of Jupiter began on November 6, 1973, from a distance of 25 million km (16 million mi), and the spacecraft returned more than 500 images. Its closest approach to Jupiter was on December 3, 1973, passing within 132,252 km (82,178 mi) of the planet. During the mission, its scientific instruments investigated the asteroid belt, the environment of Jupiter, the solar wind, cosmic rays, and the outer heliosphere.

The last signal from Pioneer 10 was received on January 23, 2003, after declining electrical power from its RTGs left the spacecraft unable to operate its radio transmitter. At that time, it was about 80 AU (12 billion km; 7.4 billion mi) from Earth.

== Mission background ==
=== History ===
In the 1960s, aerospace engineer Gary Flandro of NASA's Jet Propulsion Laboratory proposed the Planetary Grand Tour, a mission concept that would take advantage of a rare alignment of the Solar System's outer planets. Although the concept was ultimately realized in the late 1970s by the Voyager program, NASA decided in 1964 to test key elements of the mission by sending two probes to the outer Solar System. An advocacy group, the Outer Space Panel, chaired by James A. Van Allen, developed the scientific rationale for exploring the outer planets. NASA's Goddard Space Flight Center proposed a pair of "Galactic Jupiter Probes" that would pass through the asteroid belt and explore Jupiter. The spacecraft were planned for launch in 1972 and 1973 during launch windows that occurred for only a few weeks every 13 months; launching outside those windows would have required significantly more propellant.

NASA approved the mission in February 1969. Before launch, the two spacecraft were designated Pioneer F and Pioneer G; they were later renamed Pioneer 10 and Pioneer 11, respectively. They formed part of the Pioneer program, a series of uncrewed U.S. space missions launched between 1958 and 1978. Pioneer 10 and Pioneer 11 were the first spacecraft in the program designed to explore the outer Solar System. Their primary objectives were to investigate the interplanetary medium beyond Mars, study the asteroid belt, assess potential hazards to spacecraft passing through it, and explore Jupiter and its environment.

More than 150 scientific experiments were proposed for the missions. The final instrument payload, selected through a series of planning meetings during the 1960s and completed by early 1970, was designed to image and perform polarimetric observations of Jupiter and several of its moons, conduct infrared and ultraviolet observations of Jupiter, detect asteroids and meteoroids, determine the composition of charged particles, and measure magnetic fields, plasma, cosmic rays, and zodiacal light. Radio tracking during the spacecraft's occultation by Jupiter would provide measurements of the planet's atmosphere by detecting changes in the radio signal as it passed through the atmosphere. Precision tracking of the spacecraft would also improve estimates of the masses of Jupiter and its moons by measuring the small changes in the spacecraft's trajectory and velocity caused by their gravitational interactions.

NASA Ames Research Center, rather than Goddard, was selected to manage the project as part of the Pioneer program. Ames, under the direction of Charles F. Hall, was chosen because of its experience with spin-stabilized spacecraft. The mission required a small, lightweight, magnetically clean spacecraft capable of operating in interplanetary space while minimizing interference with its scientific instruments. Its design incorporated hardware previously proven on Pioneer 6 through Pioneer 9.

In February 1970, NASA awarded TRW Inc. a US$380 million contract to build both spacecraft without a competitive bidding process in order to meet the mission schedule. B. J. O'Brien and Herb Lassen led the team responsible for assembling the spacecraft. Their design and construction required an estimated 25 million man-hours.

To meet the original schedule, the first spacecraft would have had to launch between February 29 and March 17 to reach Jupiter in November 1974. The launch plan was later revised to target an arrival in December 1973, avoiding conflicts with other missions using the Deep Space Network and the period when Earth and Jupiter would be on opposite sides of the Sun. Pioneer 10's flyby trajectory was chosen to maximize scientific observations of Jupiter's radiation environment, even though mission planners expected some spacecraft systems to be damaged by the intense radiation. The planned closest approach, about three Jupiter radii from the planet's center, was considered the minimum safe distance that would still allow the spacecraft to survive the encounter while providing an unobstructed view of the sunlit hemisphere.

A backup spacecraft, Pioneer H, is on display at the National Air and Space Museum. The Pioneer 10 mission provided important information for planning the Voyager program, particularly through its measurements of Jupiter's radiation environment, magnetic field, and magnetosphere. These observations helped engineers design the Voyager spacecraft to withstand Jupiter's harsh environment.

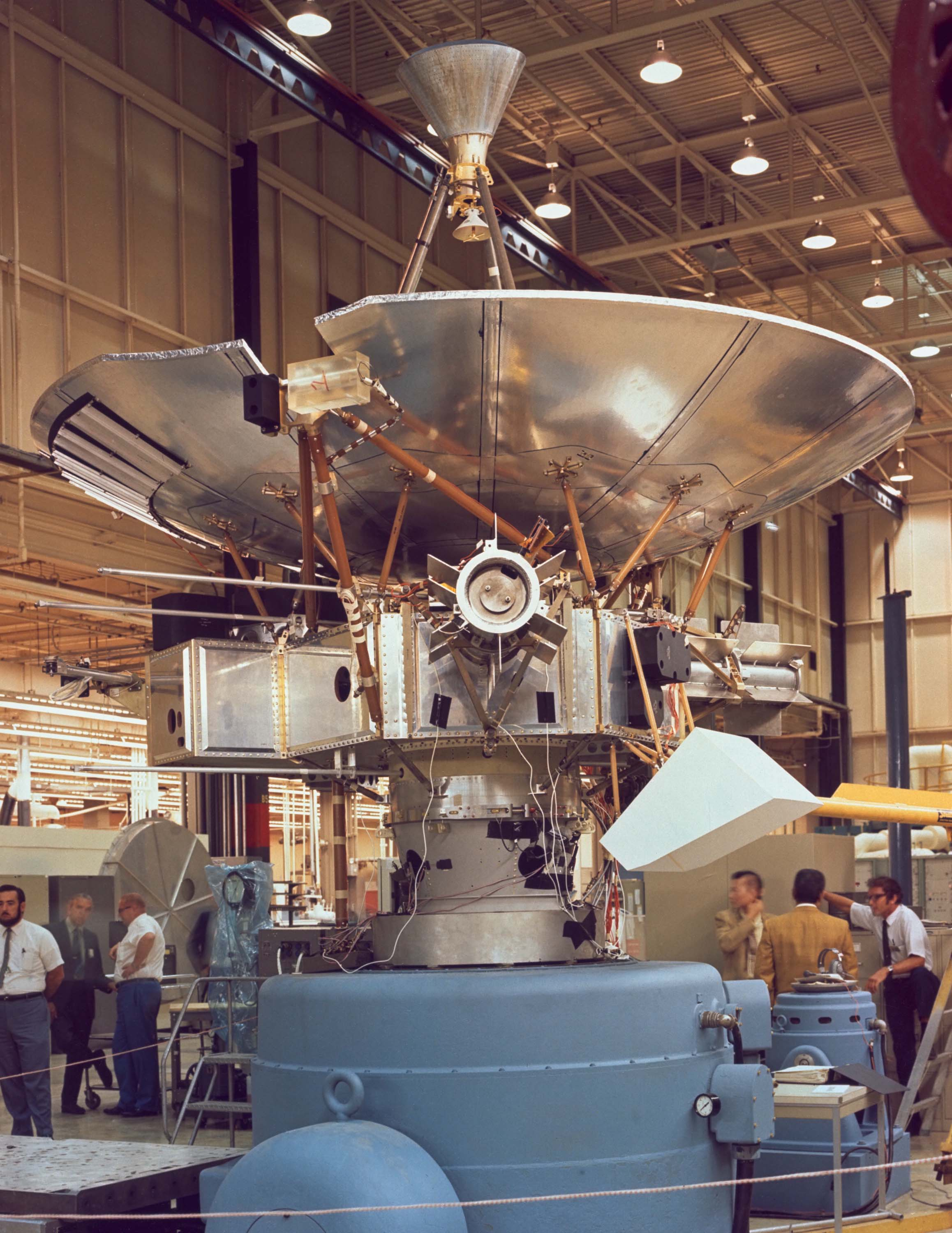
Pioneer 10 in the final stages of construction (December 1971)

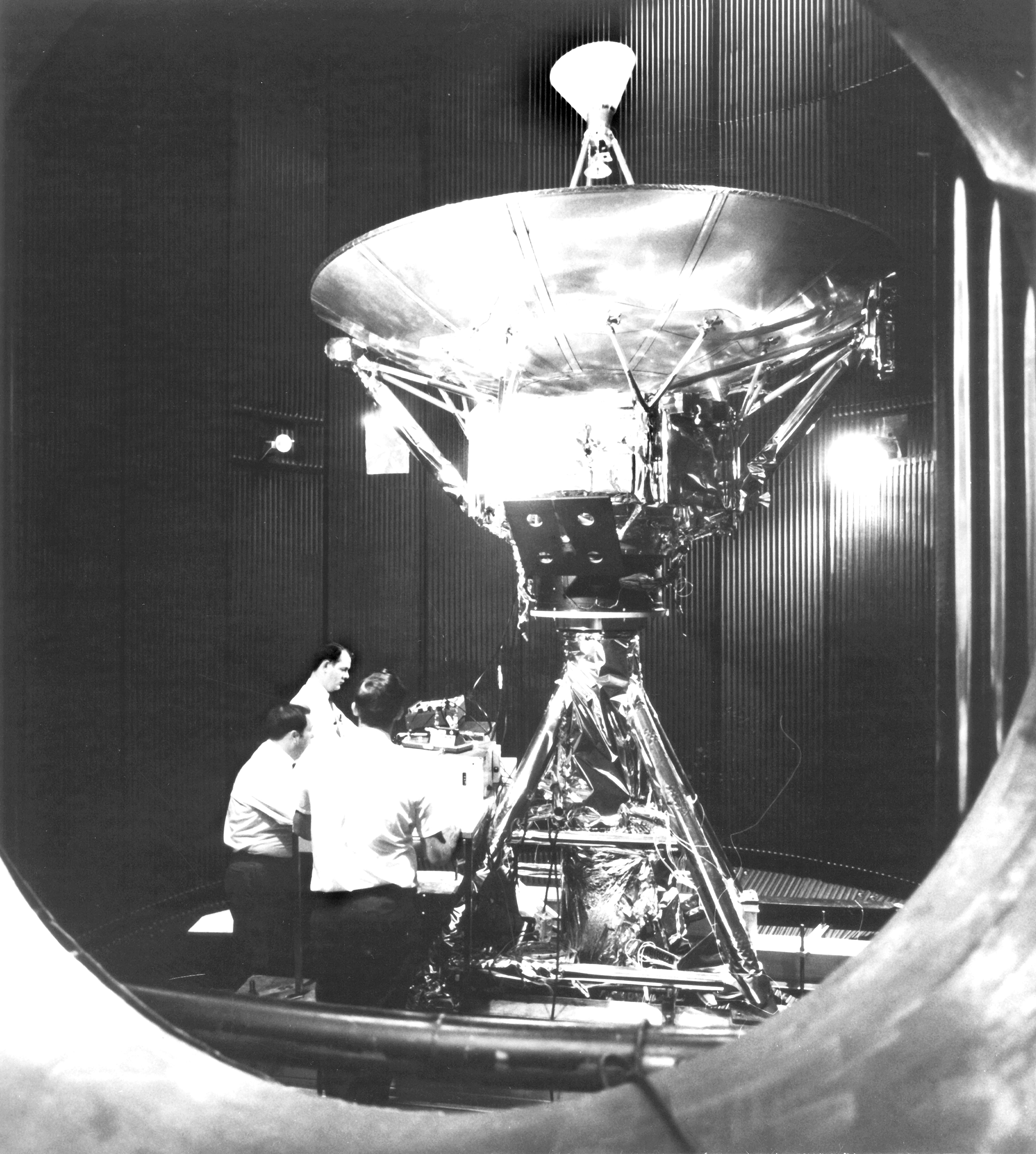
Pioneer 10 tested in a space simulation chamber (January 1972)

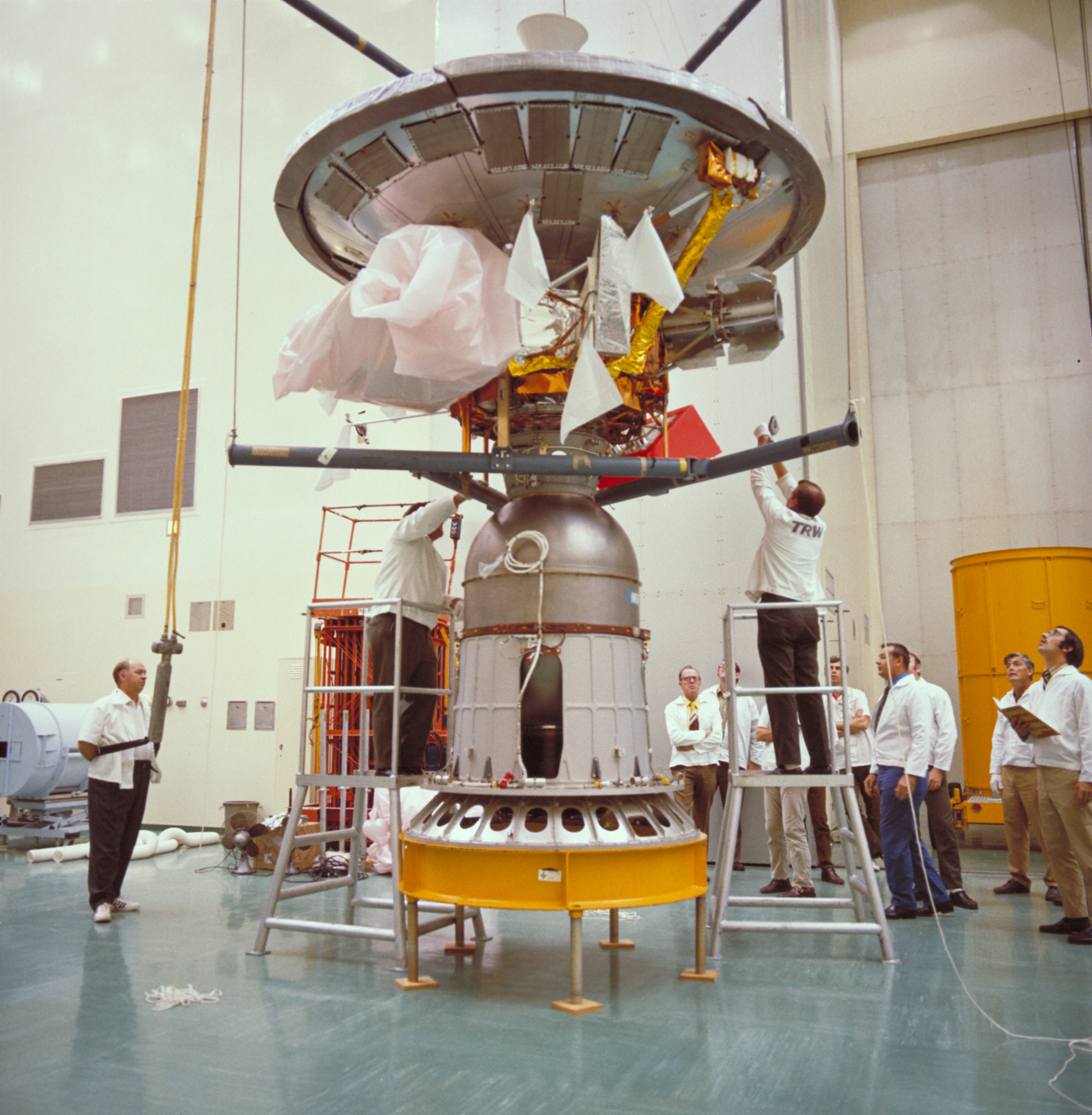
Pioneer 10 on a Star-37E kick motor just prior to being encapsulated for launch (February 1972)

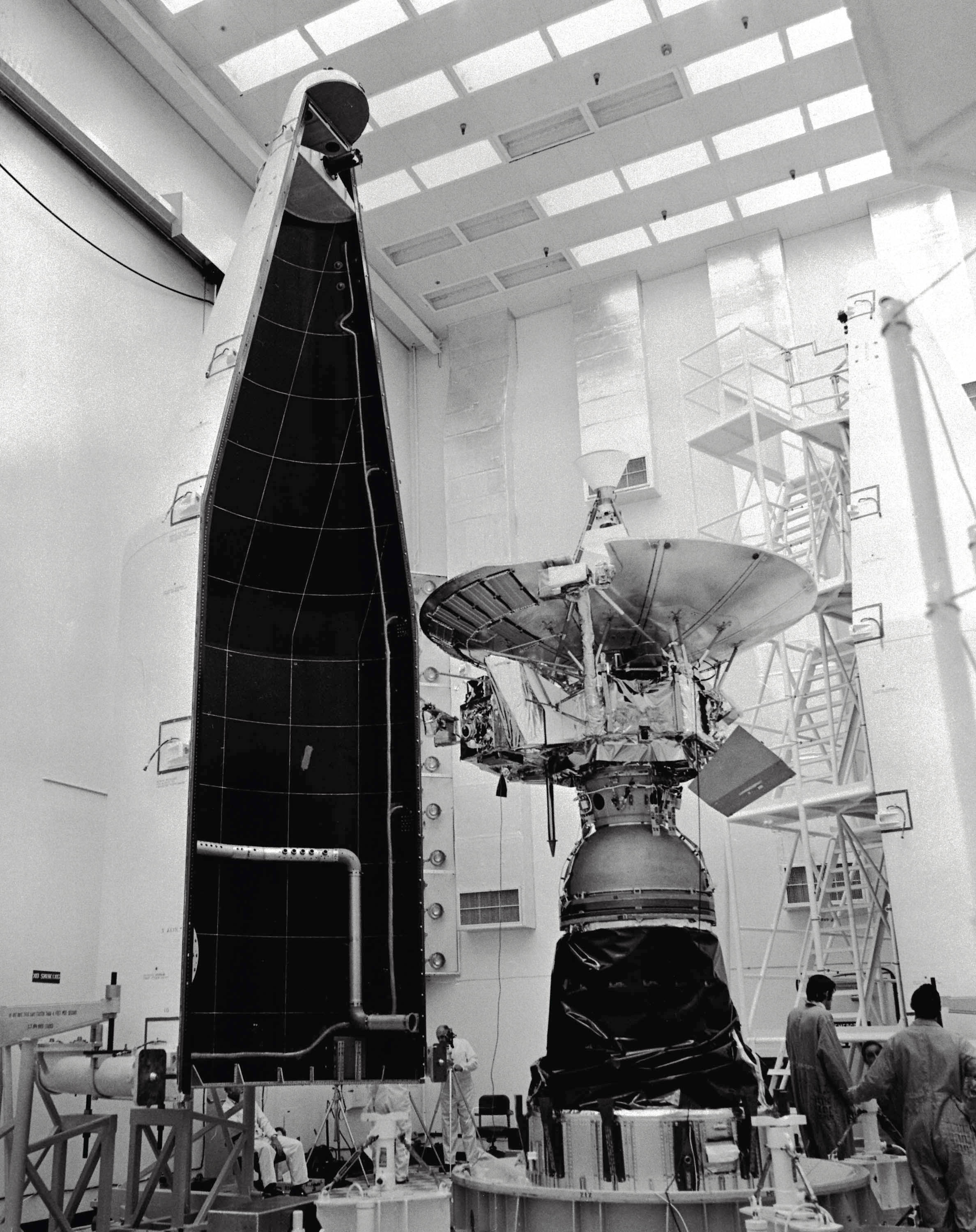
Pioneer 10 during encapsulation into payload fairing

=== Spacecraft design ===
Diagram showing the systems of Pioneer 10

The Pioneer 10 spacecraft bus is a hexagonal structure 36 cm (14 in) deep, with six panels, each 76 cm (30 in) long. It houses the propellant system used for attitude control and contains eight of the spacecraft's 11 scientific instruments. The equipment compartment is enclosed in an aluminum honeycomb structure that provides protection against meteoroid impacts. Passive thermal control is provided by multilayer insulation made of aluminized Mylar and Kapton blankets. Heat generated by the spacecraft's electronics, ranging from 70 to 120 watts (W), was dissipated through louvers beneath the mounting platform, which maintained the equipment within its operating temperature limits. At launch, the spacecraft had a mass of about 260 kg (570 lb).

Pioneer 10 carried 36 kg (79 lb) of liquid hydrazine monopropellant in a spherical tank 42 cm (17 in) in diameter. Its orientation was controlled by six 4.5 N hydrazine thrusters arranged in three pairs. One pair maintained the spacecraft's spin rate of 4.8 rpm, another provided trajectory correction maneuvers, and the third controlled attitude adjustments. The attitude thrusters also performed conical scanning maneuvers, allowing the spacecraft to maintain communication with Earth throughout the mission. Attitude information was provided by a star tracker that used Canopus as a reference, and by two Sun sensors.

==== Communication system ====
Pioneer 10 carried a redundant communications system with two transceivers. One was connected to the narrow-beam high-gain antenna, while the other was connected to the omnidirectional and medium-gain antennas. The high-gain antenna consisted of a 2.74 m (9.0 ft) parabolic dish constructed from an aluminum honeycomb sandwich. The spacecraft spun about an axis aligned with the antenna, keeping it pointed toward Earth.

Each transceiver had a power output of 8 W and operated in the S band. The system received commands from Earth at 2110 MHz and transmitted data at 2292 MHz. The downlink frequency was precisely controlled relative to the uplink frequency using a fixed turnaround ratio to ensure compatibility with NASA's Deep Space Network. Telemetry was encoded using convolutional coding, allowing most transmission errors to be detected and corrected by ground-based receiving equipment.

At launch, the data transmission rate was 256 bit/s and decreased by about 1.27 millibits per second per day over the course of the mission.

==== Power ====
SNAP-19 RTGs mounted on an extension boom of Pioneer 10 replica

Pioneer 10 was powered by four SNAP-19 radioisotope thermoelectric generators (RTGs). The RTGs were mounted on two three-rod trusses, each 3 m (9.8 ft) long and separated by 120 degrees, to minimize interference with the spacecraft's sensitive scientific instruments. Together, they produced about 155 W of electrical power at launch, declining to about 140 W by the time the spacecraft reached Jupiter. The spacecraft required approximately 100 W to operate all of its systems. The RTGs were fueled by plutonium-238 contained in multilayer capsules protected by graphite heat shields.

The SNAP-19 generators were designed to provide power for at least two years, a requirement that Pioneer 10 greatly exceeded. Because plutonium-238 has a half-life of 87.74 years, radioactive decay reduced the RTGs' output only gradually. A more significant decline resulted from the degradation of the thermocouples that converted heat into electricity. By 2001, the RTGs produced only 65 W, limiting spacecraft operations to a small number of instruments at any one time.

==== Computers ====
Most of Pioneer 10's computing was performed on the ground, with command sequences transmitted to the spacecraft. The spacecraft could store up to five commands at a time from a library of 222 commands prepared by mission controllers. Its onboard command system consisted of two command decoders and a command distribution unit. The decoders verified incoming commands, while the command distribution unit routed them to the appropriate spacecraft systems, which provided only limited onboard processing. As a result, mission operators had to prepare command sequences well in advance.

A data storage unit could record up to 6,144 bytes of scientific data, while a digital telemetry unit organized the data into one of 13 transmission formats before transmission to Earth. These formats determined how scientific and engineering data were arranged in the telemetry stream.

==== Scientific instruments ====
Helium Vector Magnetometer (HVM)
Measured the fine structure of the interplanetary magnetic field, mapped the magnetosphere of Jupiter, and provided magnetic field measurements to evaluate solar wind interaction with Jupiter. The magnetometer system consisted of a helium-filled cell mounted on a 6.6 m boom, a structural arm extending from the spacecraft to partly isolate the instrument from the spacecraft's magnetic field.: Principal investigator: Edward Smith / JPL; Data: PDS/PPI data catalog, NSSDC data archive
Quadrispherical Plasma Analyzer
Measured particles in the solar wind emitted by the Sun.: Principal investigator: Aaron Barnes / NASA Ames Research Center; Data: PDS/PPI data catalog, NSSDC data archive
Charged Particle Instrument (CPI)
Detected cosmic rays in the Solar System.: Principal investigator: John Simpson / University of Chicago; Data: NSSDC data archive
Cosmic Ray Telescope (CRT)
Collected data on the energy and composition of cosmic-ray particles.: Principal investigator: Frank B. McDonald / NASA Goddard Space Flight Center; Data: PDS/PPI data catalog, NSSDC data archive
Geiger Tube Telescope (GTT)
Surveyed the intensities, energy spectra, and angular distributions of electrons and protons along the spacecraft's path through Jupiter's radiation belts.: Principal investigator: James A. Van Allen / University of Iowa; Data: PDS/PPI data catalog, NSSDC data archive
Trapped Radiation Detector (TRD)
Consisted of an unfocused Cherenkov counter that detected light emitted by charged particles as they passed through it. It measured electrons with energies of 0.5–12 MeV. An electron scatter detector measured electrons with energies of 100–400 keV, while a solid-state diode detector measured minimum-ionizing particles with energies below 3 MeV and protons with energies of 50–350 MeV.: Principal investigator: R. Fillius / University of California San Diego; Data: NSSDC data archive
Meteoroid Detectors
Consisted of 12 pressurized cells mounted on the back of the main dish antenna that detected impacts from small meteoroids by sensing the loss of pressure caused when a meteoroid penetrated a cell.: Principal investigator: William Kinard / NASA Langley Research Center; Data: NSSDC data archive list
Asteroid/Meteoroid Detector (AMD)
Looked into space with four non-imaging telescopes and tracked particles which ranged from nearby microscopic dust to distant asteroids.: Principal investigator: Robert Soberman / General Electric Company; Data: NSSDC data archive
Ultraviolet Photometer
Sensed ultraviolet light (200 to 800 Å) to measure the abundance of hydrogen and helium in interplanetary space and Jupiter's atmosphere.: Principal investigator: Darrell Judge / University of Southern California; Data: PDS/PPI data catalog, NSSDC data archive
Imaging Photopolarimeter (IPP)
Relied on the spacecraft's rotation to scan the planet with a small telescope in narrow strips only 0.03 degrees wide, looking at the planet in red (5800 to 7000 Å) and blue (3900 to 4900 Å) light. These strips were then processed to build up a visual image of the planet.: Principal investigator: Tom Gehrels / University of Arizona; Data: NSSDC data archive list
Infrared Radiometer
Provided information on cloud temperature and the output of heat from Jupiter.: Principal investigator: Andrew Ingersoll / California Institute of Technology; Data: NSSDC data archive list

== Mission profile ==
=== Launch and trajectory ===
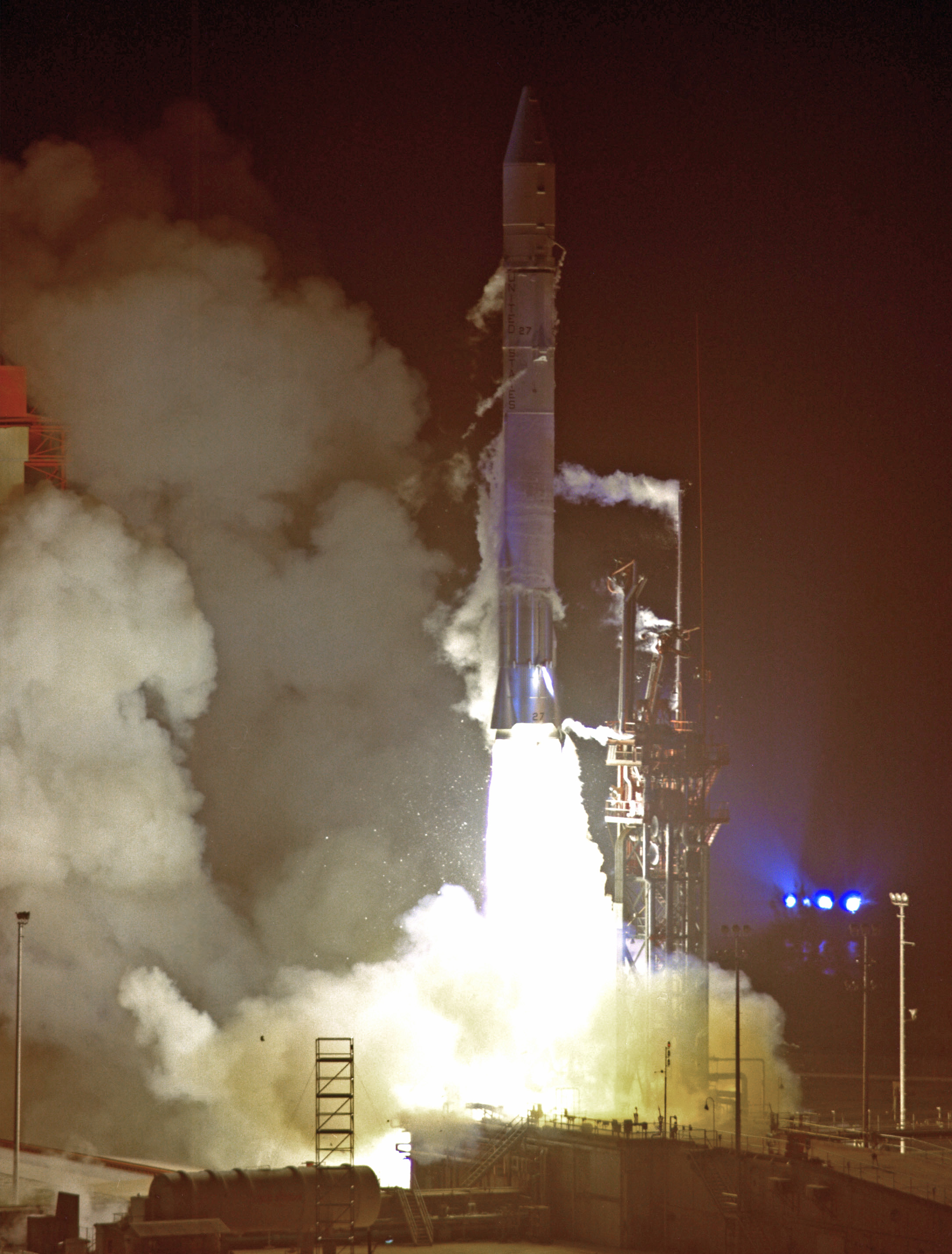
Pioneer 10 lifted off atop an Atlas-Centaur.

Animation of Pioneer 10's trajectory from March 3, 1972, to December 31, 1975 Pioneer 10 · Earth · Jupiter

Pioneer 10 was launched on March 3, 1972, at 01:49:00 UTC (8:49 p.m. Eastern Standard Time on March 2) from Cape Canaveral Launch Complex 36A, aboard an Atlas-Centaur launch vehicle. The vehicle's third stage was a Star-37E stage powered by a TE-M-364-4 solid-propellant rocket motor developed specifically for the Pioneer program. It provided about 67 kilonewtons (15,000 lbf) of thrust and spun the spacecraft to an initial rotation rate of 30 rpm. Twenty minutes after launch, the spacecraft's three booms were deployed, reducing the rotation rate to 4.8 rpm, which was maintained for the rest of the mission. The launch vehicle accelerated Pioneer 10 for 17 minutes, reaching a velocity of 51,682 km/h (32,114 mph).

After contact was established through the high-gain antenna, several instruments were activated for testing as the spacecraft traversed Earth's radiation belts. Ninety minutes after launch, Pioneer 10 reached interplanetary space. It passed the Moon 11 hours after launch and became the fastest human-made object at the time. Two days after launch, the scientific instruments were activated, beginning with the cosmic ray telescope. All instruments were operational within ten days.

During the first seven months of its journey, Pioneer 10 performed three course corrections. The spacecraft's instruments underwent checkout procedures, during which photometers observed Jupiter and zodiacal light, while other instruments measured cosmic rays, magnetic fields, and the solar wind. The only significant anomaly during this period was the failure of the Canopus sensor, which required the spacecraft to maintain its orientation using its two Sun sensors.

While traveling through the interplanetary medium, Pioneer 10 became the first mission to detect interplanetary helium atoms. It also detected high-energy ions of aluminum and sodium in the solar wind. In early August 1972, the spacecraft detected a solar shock wave from the solar storms of August 1972 at a distance of 2.2 AU (330 million km; 200 million mi), providing valuable data for heliophysics research. On July 15, 1972, Pioneer 10 became the first spacecraft to enter the asteroid belt between Mars and Jupiter. Mission planners expected it to pass safely through the belt, with the closest predicted approach to any known asteroid being 8.8 million km (5.5 million mi). One of the closest approaches was to the asteroid 307 Nike on December 2, 1972.

The spacecraft's experiments revealed fewer particles below a micrometer (μm) in the asteroid belt than in near-Earth space. The density of dust particles between 10 and 100 μm remained nearly constant from Earth to the outer edge of the belt, while particles between 100 μm and 1.0 mm increased in density by a factor of three within the belt. No fragments larger than a millimeter were detected, indicating that such objects were much rarer than expected. Because Pioneer 10 encountered no large particles, it safely crossed the asteroid belt and emerged on the other side around February 15, 1973.

=== Encounter with Jupiter ===
Animation of Pioneer 10's trajectory around Jupiter Pioneer 10 · Jupiter · Io · Europa · Ganymede · Callisto

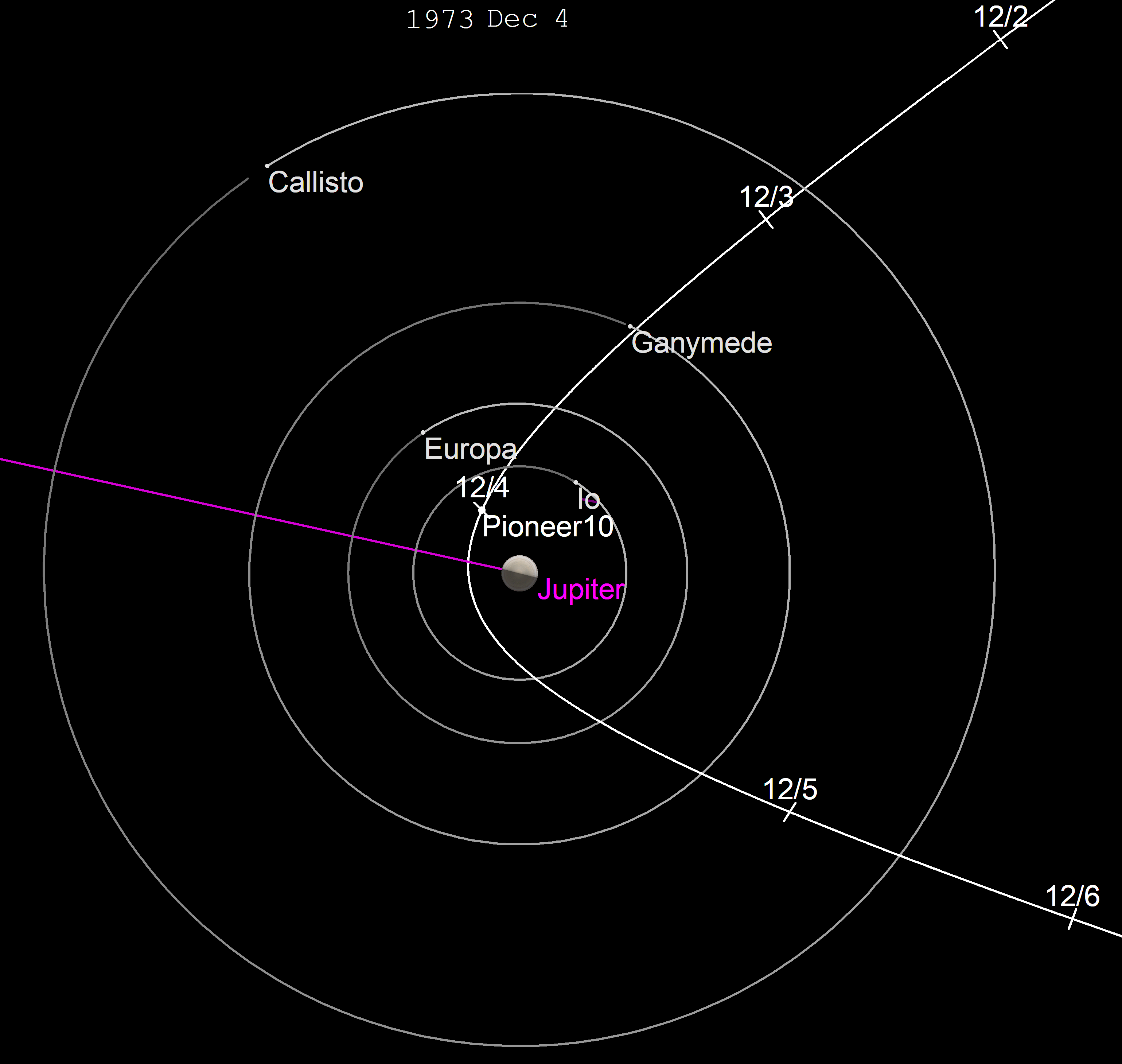
Pioneer 10's trajectory through the Jovian system

On November 6, 1973, Pioneer 10 was 25 million km (16 million mi) from Jupiter. Testing of its imaging system began, and the data were successfully received by the Deep Space Network. Mission controllers then uploaded 16,000 commands to guide the spacecraft through the next 60 days of flyby operations. Pioneer 10 passed the orbit of the outer moon Sinope on November 8. It reached the bow shock of Jupiter's magnetosphere on November 16, when the solar wind slowed from 451 km/s (280 mi/s) to 225 km/s (140 mi/s), and crossed the magnetopause, the boundary between Jupiter's magnetosphere and the surrounding solar wind, the following day. The spacecraft also confirmed that Jupiter's magnetic field has the opposite polarity to Earth's, with its magnetic poles reversed relative to those of Earth. By November 29, it had crossed the orbits of all the outermost moons and continued to operate as planned.

Pioneer 10's imaging photopolarimeter produced red and blue images as the spacecraft's rotation swept the instrument across Jupiter. These images were combined with a synthetic green channel to create full-color composites. By November 26, twelve such images had been received on Earth. By December 2, their quality surpassed the best Earth-based images of Jupiter available at the time. They were displayed in near real time, and the Pioneer program later received an Emmy Award for its public presentation of the mission. Motion of the spacecraft introduced geometric distortions that were later corrected through computer processing. During the encounter, Pioneer 10 transmitted more than 500 images.

The spacecraft's trajectory followed Jupiter's magnetic equator, where the ion radiation is concentrated. Electron radiation there is about 10,000 times stronger than the maximum levels found around Earth. Passing within 20 R_{J} through the inner radiation belts, Pioneer 10 received an integrated radiation dose of about 200,000 rads from electrons and 56,000 rads from protons. For comparison, a whole-body dose of 500 rads is fatal to humans. Radiation levels proved to be about ten times higher than mission planners had predicted, raising concerns that the spacecraft would not survive the encounter. Beginning on December 3, the intense radiation caused false commands to be generated. Although contingency commands corrected most of them, some images of Io and close-up views of Jupiter were lost. Similar false commands occurred as the spacecraft departed the planet. Despite these problems, Pioneer 10 successfully returned images of Ganymede and Europa. Images of Ganymede revealed low-albedo regions near the center and south pole, while the north pole appeared brighter. Europa was too distant for detailed imaging, although some albedo features were visible.

Pioneer 10's trajectory carried it behind Io, allowing scientists to measure the effects of the moon's atmosphere on the spacecraft's radio signals. The observations showed that Io's ionosphere extended about 700 km (430 mi) above Io's dayside surface, with electron densities ranging from about 60,000 electrons per cubic centimeter on the dayside to 9,000 on the nightside. An unexpected discovery was that Io orbits within a hydrogen cloud extending about 805,000 km (500,000 mi), with a width and height of about 402,000 km (250,000 mi). A smaller hydrogen cloud, about 110,000 km (68,000 mi) across, was also believed to have been detected near Europa.

NASA did not decide to use Jupiter's gravity to send Pioneer 10 out of the Solar System until after the spacecraft had passed across the asteroid belt. Pioneer 10 was the first spacecraft to perform such a gravity-assist maneuver, establishing a model for many later missions. Although this extended mission was not part of the original proposal, it was planned before launch.

At closest approach, Pioneer 10 reached a speed of 132,000 km/h (82,000 mph; 37,000 m/s) and passed within 132,252 km (82,178 mi) of Jupiter's outer atmosphere. It obtained close-up images of the Great Red Spot and the planet's terminator, the boundary between its day and night sides, before communication was temporarily interrupted as the spacecraft passed behind Jupiter. Radio occultation measurements revealed a temperature inversion in the upper atmosphere between pressure levels of 10 and 100 mbar, equivalent to about 1–10% of Earth's average sea-level atmospheric pressure. Temperatures ranged from −133 to −113 °C (140 to 160 K; −207 to −171 °F) at 10 mbar and from −183 to −163 °C (90.1 to 110.1 K; −297.4 to −261.4 °F) at 100 mbar. Pioneer 10 also produced an infrared map confirming that Jupiter emits more heat than it receives from the Sun.

As Pioneer 10 receded from Jupiter, it returned crescent views of the planet. It also crossed Jupiter's magnetospheric bow shock several more times. Because the bow shock shifts in response to changes in the solar wind, the spacecraft crossed it 17 times before finally leaving Jupiter's magnetosphere.

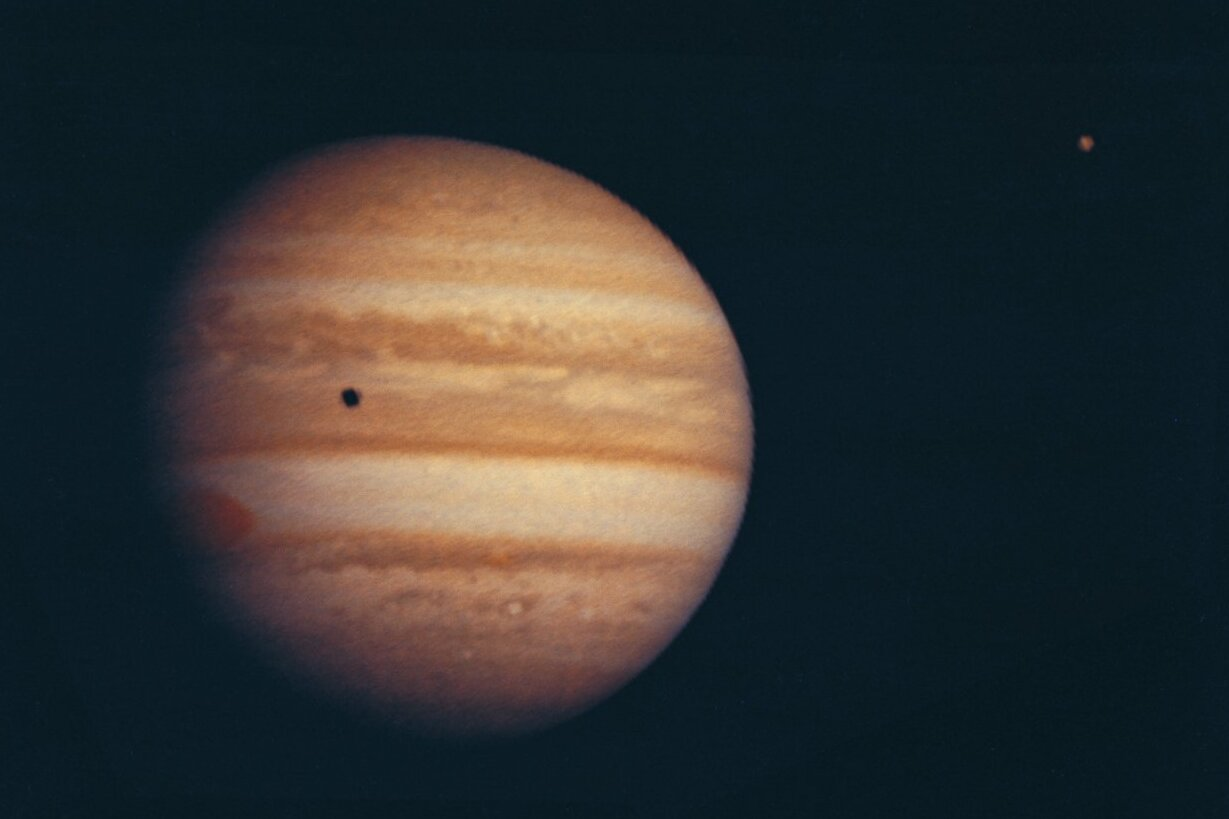
Jupiter as imaged by Pioneer 10

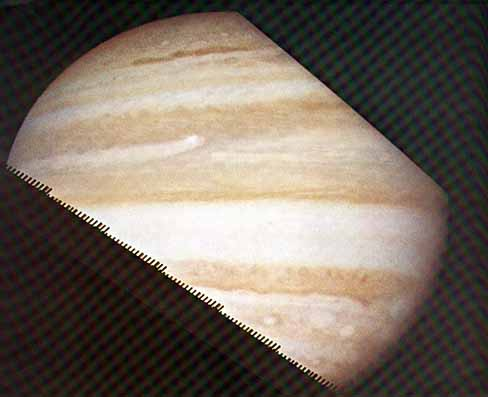
Jupiter close up as imaged by Pioneer 10

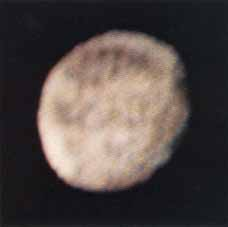
Ganymede as imaged by Pioneer 10

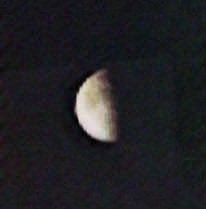
Europa as imaged by Pioneer 10

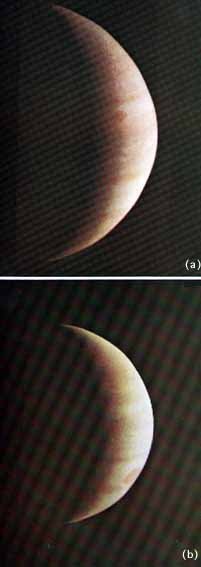
Crescent Jupiter as imaged by Pioneer 10
Media related to the Pioneer 10 Jupiter encounter at Wikimedia Commons

=== Deep space ===
After its encounter with Jupiter, Pioneer 10 crossed Saturn's orbit in 1976 and Uranus's orbit in 1979. On June 13, 1983, it crossed Neptune's orbit, becoming the first human-made object to pass beyond the orbits of the Solar System's major planets. The mission officially ended on March 31, 1997, when the spacecraft was 67 AU (10.0 billion km; 6.2 billion mi) from the Sun, although it continued to transmit usable data after that date.

After the mission ended, the Deep Space Network continued to track Pioneer 10's increasingly weak radio signal to train flight controllers in techniques for acquiring deep-space spacecraft signals. Research funded by the NASA Institute for Advanced Concepts applied chaos theory to recover coherent data from the fading transmission.

The last successful reception of telemetry from Pioneer 10 occurred on April 27, 2002. Subsequent signals were too weak to provide usable data, although they could still be detected. The final signal from the spacecraft was received on January 23, 2003, when it was about 80 AU (12 billion km; 7.4 billion mi) from Earth. Further attempts to contact the spacecraft were unsuccessful. A final transmission attempt was made on March 4, 2006, but no response was received. NASA concluded that the output of the spacecraft's radioisotope thermoelectric generators had likely fallen below the level required to power the transmitter, and no further contact attempts were made.

=== Timeline ===
Pioneer 10 and Pioneer 11 speed and distance from the Sun

Pioneer 10 is shown in yellow on this map of the trajectories of interstellar probes.

Date	Event
1972-03-03	Spacecraft launched at 01:49:00 UTC.
1972-06-	Crossed orbit of Mars.
1972-07-15	Entered asteroid belt.
1973-02-15	Exited asteroid belt.
1973-12	Start Jupiter observation phase.
1973-12-03	Beginning of encounter with the Jovian system.
12:26:00	Callisto flyby at 1,392,300 km (865,100 mi).
13:56:00	Ganymede flyby at 446,250 km (277,290 mi).
19:26:00	Europa flyby at 321,000 km (199,000 mi).
22:56:00	Io flyby at 357,000 km (222,000 mi).
1973-12-04	
02:26:00	Jupiter closest approach at 200,000 km (120,000 mi).
02:36:00	Jupiter equator plane crossing.
02:41:45	Io occultation entry.
02:43:16	Io occultation exit.
03:42:25	Jupiter occultation entry.
03:42:25	Jupiter shadow entry.
04:15:35	Jupiter occultation exit.
04:47:21	Jupiter shadow exit.
1974-01-01	End of Jupiter observation phase.
1974-01-01	Begin extended mission.

Extended mission
1983-04-25	Pioneer 10 crossed Pluto's orbit. Because of Pluto's highly eccentric orbit, it was closer to the Sun than Neptune at the time.
1983-06-13	Pioneer 10 crossed Neptune's orbit, the outermost known planetary orbit, becoming the first human-made object to pass beyond the orbits of the Solar System's major planets. At the time, TRW offered a recorded version of the spacecraft's data by telephone at 1-900-410-4111, created by slowing the data stream and converting it into audible sound.
1997-03-31	NASA officially ended the mission, although contact with the spacecraft continued to obtain telemetry.
1998-02-17	Voyager 1 overtakes Pioneer 10 as the most distant human-made object from the Sun, at 69.419 AU (10.4 billion km; 6.45 billion mi). Voyager 1 is moving away from the Sun over 1 AU per year faster than Pioneer 10.
2002-04-27	Last successful telemetry reception: 33 minutes of error-free data were received from a distance of 80.22 AU (12.0 billion km; 7.46 billion mi).
2003-01-23	Final signal received from the spacecraft; the transmission was extremely weak.
2003-02-07	An attempt to contact the spacecraft was unsuccessful.
2006-03-04	Final unsuccessful attempt to contact the spacecraft.
2023-07-18	Voyager 2 passed Pioneer 10 to become the second-most-distant spacecraft from the Sun.

== Current status and future ==
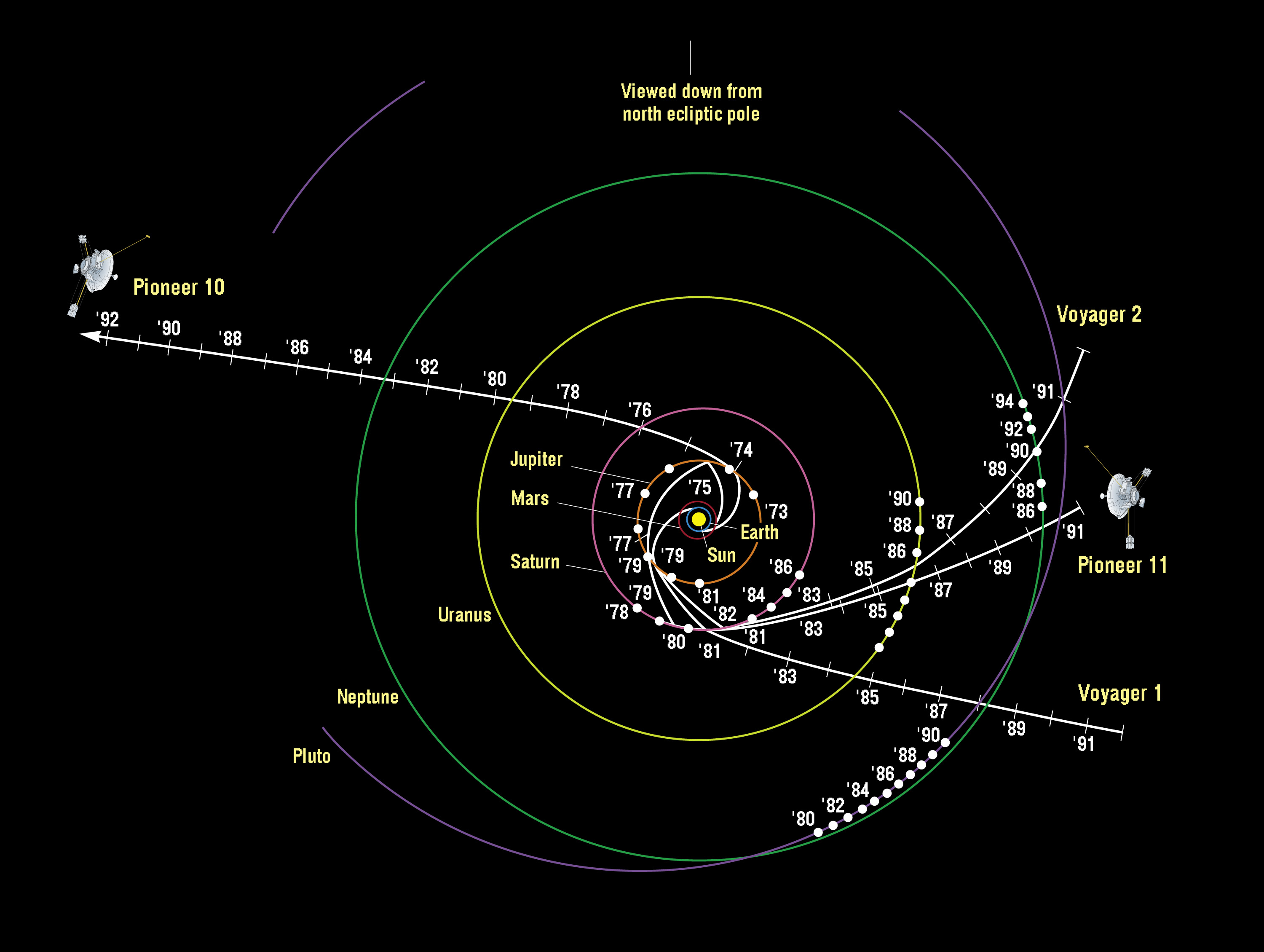
NASA map showing trajectories of the Pioneer 10, Pioneer 11, Voyager 1, and Voyager 2 spacecraft

On July 18, 2023, Voyager 2 overtook Pioneer 10, making Pioneer 10 the third-most-distant spacecraft from the Sun, after Voyager 1 and Voyager 2. As of July 2026, Pioneer 10 is estimated to be about 141.4 AU (21.2 billion km; 13.1 billion mi) from the Sun and 142.3 AU (21.3 billion km; 13.2 billion mi) from Earth. Sunlight takes about 19.7 hours to reach the spacecraft, and the Sun appears at an apparent magnitude of −15.9. Pioneer 10 is traveling in the direction of the constellation Taurus.

If undisturbed, Pioneer 10, Pioneer 11, the two Voyager spacecraft, and New Horizons will continue traveling through interstellar space. Pioneer 10's trajectory is directed toward Aldebaran, which is currently about 68 light-years from the Sun. The spacecraft would take more than two million years to reach Aldebaran's present location. Long before then, in about 90,000 years, Pioneer 10 is expected to pass within about 0.23 parsecs (0.75 light-years) of HIP 117795, a late K-type star.

== Pioneer anomaly ==
Analysis of radio tracking data from Pioneer 10 and Pioneer 11 at distances of 20–70 AU from the Sun revealed a small but persistent anomalous Doppler frequency drift, a gradual change in the frequency of the spacecraft's radio signal. The drift was consistent with a constant acceleration of (8.74 ± 1.33) × 10^{−10} m/s^{2} directed toward the Sun. Although researchers initially suspected an unidentified systematic error, no clear cause was found, prompting decades of investigation. Analyses published in 2012 by physicist Slava Turyshev and his team showed that the anomaly was caused by uneven thermal radiation emitted by the spacecraft, which produced a small recoil force directed toward the Sun.

== Pioneer plaque ==
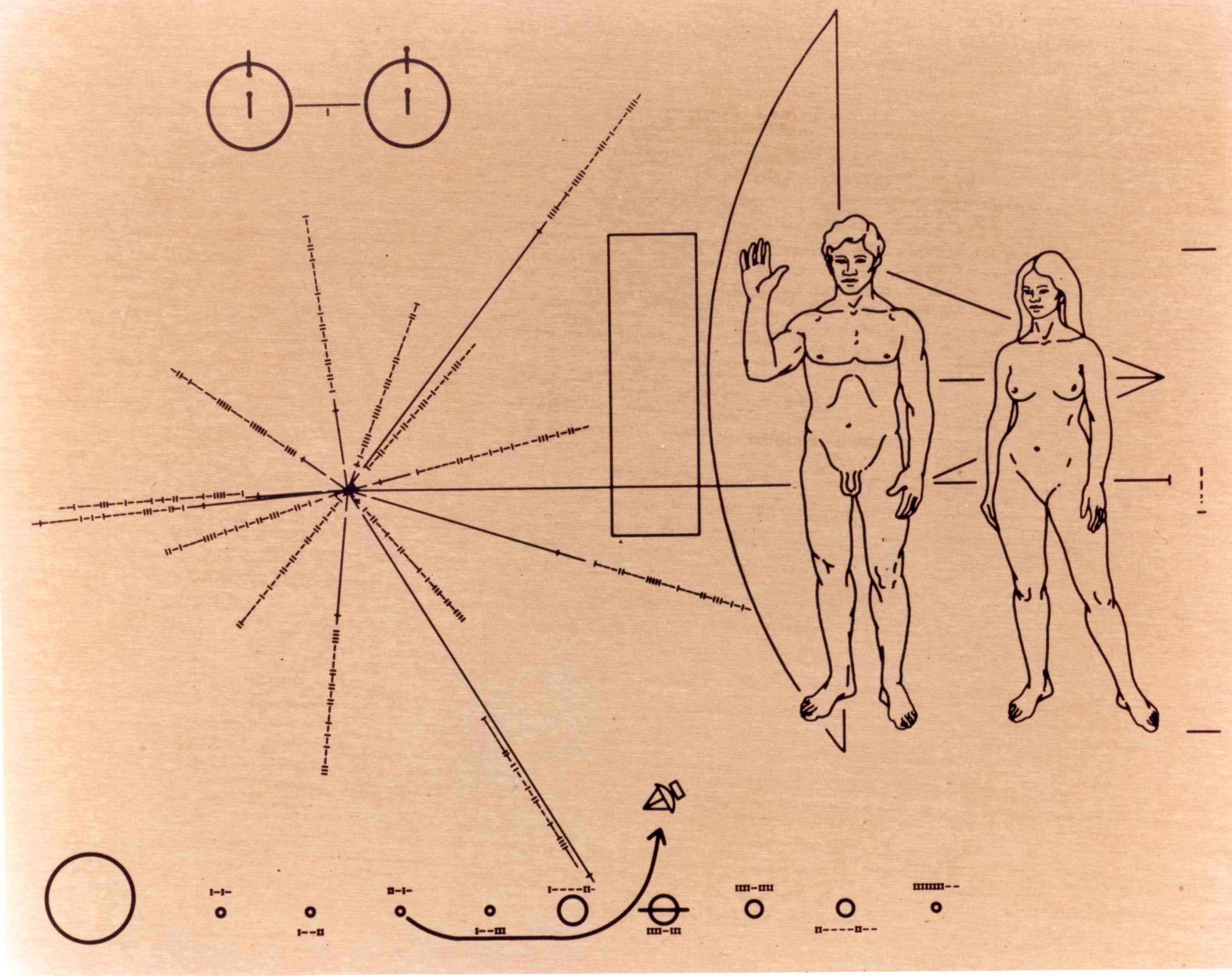
Pioneer plaque

Because it was strongly advocated by Carl Sagan, Pioneer 10 and Pioneer 11 each carry a 152 by 229 mm (6.0 by 9.0 in) gold-anodized aluminum plaque intended as a message in the event that either spacecraft is ever discovered by intelligent extraterrestrial life. The plaque depicts nude male and female human figures alongside a series of symbolic diagrams designed to convey the spacecraft's origin. It is mounted on the antenna support struts, where it is shielded from erosion by interstellar dust.

== In popular culture ==
Pioneer 10 has appeared in several works of popular culture and has been commemorated on a commemorative stamp. On February 28, 1975, a stamp depicting Pioneer 10 was issued in Mountain View, California. In the 1989 film Star Trek V: The Final Frontier, a Klingon ship destroys the spacecraft for target practice. In the serialized speculative fiction multimedia narrative 17776, Pioneer 10 is portrayed as a sentient character. In the 1995 video game Chaos Control, an alien encounter with Pioneer 10 triggers a conflict between humanity and an extraterrestrial civilization.

== See also ==
- Exploration of Jupiter
- List of missions to the outer planets
- Timeline of artificial satellites and space probes
