= Flyby anomaly =

Unexplained observed excessive energy during Earth flybys of spacecraft

Unsolved problem in physics
What causes the unexpected change in acceleration for flybys of spacecraft?
More unsolved problems in physics

The flyby anomaly is a discrepancy between current scientific models and the actual increase in speed (i.e. increase in kinetic energy) observed during a planetary flyby (usually of Earth) by a spacecraft. In multiple cases, spacecraft have been observed to gain greater speed than scientists had predicted, but thus far no convincing explanation has been found. This anomaly has been observed as shifts in the S-band and X-band Doppler and ranging telemetry. The largest discrepancy noticed during a flyby is tiny: 13.46 mm/s.

== Observations ==
Gravitational assists are valuable techniques for Solar System exploration. Because the success of such flyby maneuvers depends on the exact geometry of the trajectory, the position and velocity of a spacecraft during its encounter with a planet is continually tracked with great precision by earth telemetry, e.g. via the Deep Space Network (DSN).

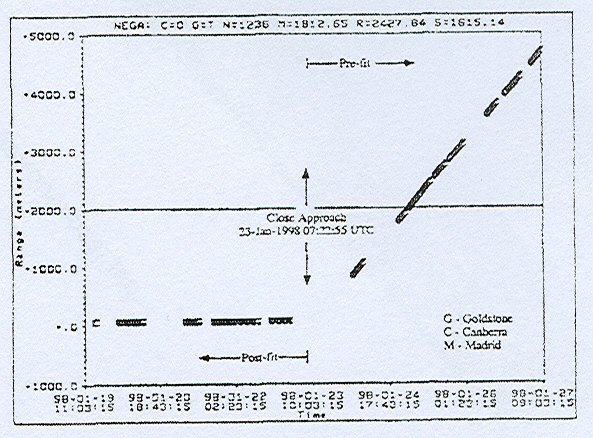
Range residuals during the Earth flyby of NEAR

During its flyby, MESSENGER did not observe any anomalies

The flyby anomaly was first noticed during a careful inspection of DSN Doppler data shortly after the Earth flyby of the Galileo spacecraft 8 December 1990. While the Doppler residuals (observed minus computed data) were expected to remain flat, the analysis revealed an unexpected 66 mHz shift, which corresponds to a velocity increase of 3.92 mm/s at perigee. Investigations of this effect at the Jet Propulsion Laboratory (JPL), the Goddard Space Flight Center (GSFC) and the University of Texas have not yielded a satisfactory explanation.

No such anomaly was detected after the second Earth flyby of Galileo in December 1992, where the measured velocity decrease matched that expected from atmospheric drag at the lower altitude of 303 km. However, the drag estimates had large error bars, and so an anomalous acceleration could not be ruled out.

On 23 January 1998 the Near Earth Asteroid Rendezvous (NEAR) spacecraft experienced an anomalous velocity increase of 13.46 mm/s after its Earth encounter. Cassini–Huygens gained around 0.11 mm/s in August 1999, and Rosetta gained 1.82 mm/s after its Earth flyby in March 2005.

An analysis of the MESSENGER spacecraft (studying Mercury) did not reveal any significant unexpected velocity increase. This may be because MESSENGER both approached and departed Earth symmetrically about the equator (see data and proposed equation below). This suggests that the anomaly may be related to Earth's rotation.

In November 2009, ESA's Rosetta spacecraft was tracked closely during its third Earth flyby in order to precisely measure its velocity, in an effort to gather further data about the anomaly, but no significant anomaly was found.

The 2013 flyby of Juno on the way to Jupiter yielded no anomalous acceleration.

In 2018, a careful analysis of the trajectory of the presumed interstellar asteroid ʻOumuamua revealed a small excess velocity as it receded from the Sun. Initial speculation suggested that the anomaly was due to outgassing, though none had been detected.

Summary of some Earth-flyby spacecraft is provided in table below.

| Craft Data | Galileo I | Galileo II | NEAR | Cassini | Rosetta-I | MESSENGER | Rosetta-II | Rosetta-III | Juno | Hayabusa2 | OSIRIS-REx | BepiColombo |
|---|---|---|---|---|---|---|---|---|---|---|---|---|
| Date | 1990-12-08 | 1992-12-08 | 1998-01-23 | 1999-08-18 | 2005-03-04 | 2005-08-02 | 2007-11-13 | 2009-11-13 | 2013-10-09 | 2015-12-03 | 2017-09-22 | 2020-04-10 |
| Speed at infinity, km/s | 8.949 | 8.877 | 6.851 | 16.01 | 3.863 | 4.056 | | | | 4.7 | | |
| Speed at perigee, km/s | 13.738 | 14.077 | 12.739 | 19.03 | 10.517 | 10.389 | 12.49 | 13.34 | 14.93 | 10.3 | 8.5 | |
| Impact parameter, km | 11261 | | 12850 | 8973 | 22680.49 | 22319 | | | | | | 19064 |
| Minimal altitude, km | 956 | 303 | 532 | 1172 | 1954 | 2336 | 5322 | 2483 | 561 | 3090 | 17237 | 12677 |
| Spacecraft mass, kg | 2497.1 | 2223.0 | 730.40 | 4612.1 | 2895.2 | 1085.6 | 2895 | 2895 | ~2720 | 590 | | 4000 |
| Trajectory inclination to equator, degrees | 142.9 | 138.9 | 108.0 | 25.4 | 144.9 | 133.1 | | | | | | |
| Deflection angle, degrees | 47.46 | 51.1 | 66.92 | 19.66 | 99.396 | 94.7 | | | | 80 | | |
| Speed increment at infinity, mm/s | 3.92±0.08 | −4.60±1.00 | 13.46±0.13 | −2±1 | 1.82±0.05 | 0.02±0.01 | ~0 | ~0 | 0±0.8 | ? | ? | 0±0.003 |
| Speed increment at perigee, mm/s | 2.560±0.050 | −9.200±0.600 | 7.210±0.0700 | −1.700±0.9000 | 0.670±0.0200 | 0.008±0.004 | ~0.000±0.000 | −0.004±0.044 | | ? | ? | ? |
| Gained energy, J/kg | 35.1±0.7 | | 92.2±0.9 | | 7.03±0.19 | | | | | ? | ? | ? |

== Anderson's empirical relation ==
An empirical equation for the anomalous flyby velocity change was proposed in 2008 by J. D. Anderson et al.:

$$\frac{dV}{V} = \frac{2 \omega_\text{E} R_\text{E} (\cos \varphi_\text{i} - \cos \varphi_\text{o})}{c},$$

where ω_{E} is the angular frequency of the Earth, R_{E} is the Earth radius, and φ_{i} and φ_{o} are the inbound and outbound equatorial angles of the spacecraft. This formula was derived later by Jean Paul Mbelek from special relativity, leading to one of the possible explanations of the effect. This does not, however, consider the SSN residuals –see "Possible explanations" below.

== Possible explanations ==
There have been a number of proposed explanations of the flyby anomaly, including:

- A postulated consequence of the assumption that the speed of light is isotropic in all frames, and invariant in the method used to measure the velocity of the space probes by means of the Doppler effect. The inconsistent anomalous values measured: positive, null or negative are simply explained relaxing this assumption. During flyby maneuvers the velocity components of the probe in the direction of the observer V_{o} are derived from the relative displacement df of the radiofrequency f transmitted by the probe, multiplied by the local speed of the light c′ by the Doppler effect: V_{o} = (df / f) c′. According to the Céspedes-Curé hypothesis, the movement through variable gravitational energy density fields produces slight variations of the refractive index n′ of space and therefore of the speed of light c′ which leads to unaccounted corrections of the Doppler data that are based on an invariant c. This leads to incorrect estimates of the speed or energy change in the flyby maneuver on the Earth's frame of reference.
- Unaccounted-for transverse Doppler effect, i.e. the redshift of light source with zero radial and non-zero tangential velocity. However, this cannot explain the similar anomaly in the ranging data.
- A dark-matter halo around Earth.
- The impact of general relativity, in its weak-field and linearized form yielding gravitomagnetic phenomena like frame-dragging, has been investigated as well: it turns out to be unable to account for the flyby anomaly.
- Range-proportional excess delay of the telemetry signal revealed by the United States Space Surveillance Network range data in the NEAR flyby. This delay, accounting for the anomaly in both Doppler and range data, as well as the trailing Doppler oscillations, to within 10–20%, points to chirp modes in the reception due to the Doppler rate, predicting a positive anomaly only when the tracking by DSN is interrupted around perigee, and zero or negative anomaly if tracked continuously. No anomaly should occur in Doppler tracked by non-DSN stations.
- The action of a topological torsion current predicting flyby anomalies in retrograde direction, but null-effect when spacecraft approach the planet in prograde direction with respect to the planetary sense of rotation.
- The analysis of the Juno flyby looked at analysis errors that could potentially mimic the flyby anomaly. They found that a high-precision gravity field of at least 50×50 coefficients was needed for accurate flyby predictions. Use of a lower-precision gravity field (such as a model with 10×10 coefficients, sufficient for launch analysis), would yield a 4.5 mm/s velocity error.
- An internal investigation of Rosetta data in the European Space Operations Centre Flight Dynamics Team found that a potential explanation for this effect would be outgassing of previously shadowed surfaces under their illumination by Earth's albedo. This was correlated with out-gassing like behaviour observed in the attitude control system. Also it provides an explanation for this effect not being present in subsequent flybys.

== Proposed measurement ==
Satellite missions that use the Global Navigation Satellite System to determine positions with very high accuracy could, in principle, shed some light on the anomaly. One proposed mission, the STE-QUEST (Space–Time Explorer and Quantum Equivalence Principle Space Test), also would use an advantageous highly elliptical orbit which should be able to distinguish a flyby anomaly from statistical flight path measurement errors. However, this mission was not selected for launch in 2014.

== See also ==
- List of unsolved problems in physics
- Modified Newtonian dynamics
- Pioneer anomaly

== Literature ==
- J. D. Anderson; J. G. Williams (2001), "Long-range tests of the equivalence principle", Class. Quantum Grav., 18 (13): 2447–2456, Bibcode:2001CQGra..18.2447A, doi:10.1088/0264-9381/18/13/307, S2CID 250861959.
- C. Lämmerzahl; O. Preuss; H. Dittus (2006), "Is the physics within the Solar system really understood?", Proceedings of the 359th WE-Heraeus Seminar on "Lasers, Clocks, and Drag-Free: Technologies for Future Exploration in Space and Tests of Gravity", arXiv:gr-qc/0604052, Bibcode:2006gr.qc.....4052L.
- J. D. Anderson; J. K. Campbell; M. M. Nieto (2007), "The Energy Transfer Process in Planetary Flybys", New Astronomy, 12 (5): 383–397, arXiv:astro-ph/0608087, Bibcode:2007NewA...12..383A, doi:10.1016/j.newast.2006.11.004, S2CID 15913052.
- NASA Baffled by Unexplained Force Acting on Space Probes (2008), at Space.com.
- J. D. Anderson; J. K. Campbell; J. E. Ekelund; J. Ellis; J. F. Jordan (2008), "Anomalous Orbital-Energy Changes Observed during Spacecraft Flybys of Earth" (PDF), Phys. Rev. Lett., 100 (91102) 091102, Bibcode:2008PhRvL.100i1102A, doi:10.1103/PhysRevLett.100.091102, PMID 18352689, archived from the original (PDF) on 2008-10-16.
- Wanted: Einstein Jr (2008), at Economist.com.
- K. Svozil (2007). "Microphysical analogues of flyby anomalies". New Astronomy. 12 (5): 383–397. arXiv:0804.2198. Bibcode:2007NewA...12..383A. doi:10.1016/j.newast.2006.11.004. S2CID 15913052.
