= Terrestrial atmospheric lens =

Concept of using Earth's atmosphere as a large lens

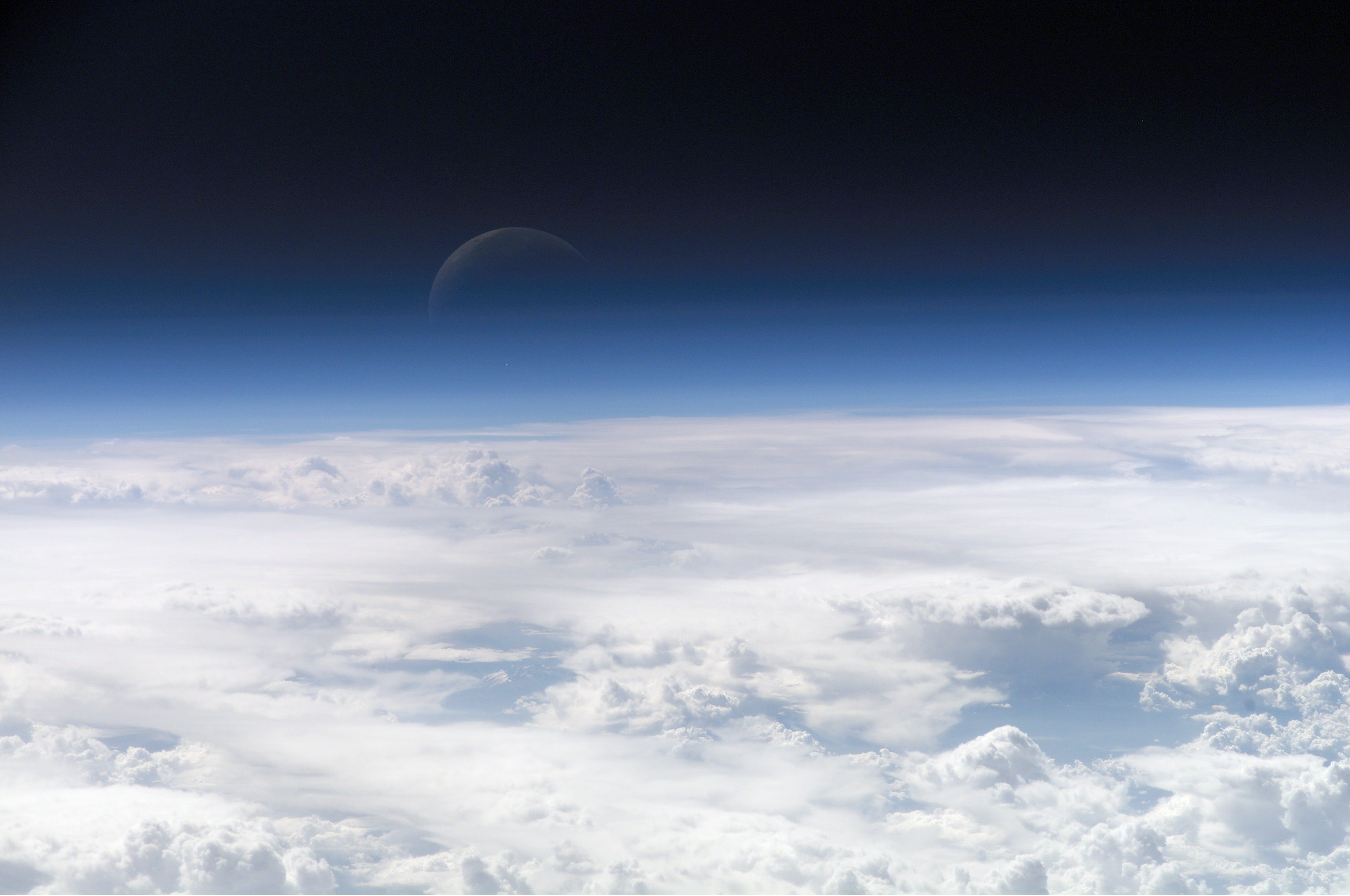
Earth's atmosphere

A terrestrial atmospheric lens telescope, also known as a terrascope, is a theoretical method of using the Earth's atmosphere as a large lens to build a very powerful telescope, proposed by British astronomer David Kipping. It is based on atmospheric refraction.

If built, the terrestrial atmospheric lens telescope would become the largest telescope ever built. Its high resolution would allow to directly image nearby Earth-like planets with a level of detail never seen before. Possible observation targets are Proxima b, located 4.2 light years away, Tau Ceti e, 12 light years away, and Teegarden b, also located 12 light years away. The three planets are currently considered to be potentially habitable.

Using the Sun as a gravitational lens would produce images with higher resolution when imaging potentially habitable exoplanets, but with significantly lower practicality owing to the distance at which such an instrument would have to be located.

== See also ==
- Gravitational lens
- Solar gravitational lens
- Gravitational microlensing
