= Bartol Research Institute =

Scientific research institution

- Established: 1924
- Focus: Physics
- Address: Sharp Lab, 104 The Green, Newark, DE, 19716
- Location: Newark, Delaware
- Coordinates: 39°40′52″N 75°45′11″W
- Interactive map of Bartol Research Institute
- Website: The Bartol Research Institute

The Bartol Research Institute (formerly the Bartol Research Foundation) is a scientific research institution at the Department of Physics and Astronomy of the University of Delaware. Its members belong to the faculty of the University of Delaware and perform research in areas such as astroparticle physics, astrophysics, cosmology, particle physics, and space science.

== Research ==
Having a strong research mission, the Bartol Research Institute has counted several renowned physicists among its members, mostly focusing on fundamental science. Starting with its first director, W.F.G. Swann, cosmic rays were and still are one of the main research topics. With its second director, Martin A. Pomerantz, an Antarctic research program was developed along these lines and is maintained until today: Bartol scientists contribute to several Antarctic cosmic-ray projects, including ballon-borne cosmic-ray detectors such as ANITA, and ground-based experiments such as neutron monitors and the IceCube Neutrino Observatory.

Furthermore, nuclear physics and high-energy physics belonged to the research portfolio since early on. Today research is done in particular in theoretical particle physics and theoretical as well as experimental particle astrophysics. Consequently, the Bartol Research Institute is a member of several major international collaborations that run some of the leading experiments in this field, such as VERITAS, the Cherenkov Telescope Array, the Pierre Auger Observatory, and IceCube. In 2012, Qaisar Shafi was appointed the Inaugural Bartol Research Institute Professor of Physics.

Space physics, including plasma and solar physics, is another major research area of the Bartol Research Institute. Among its members is William H. Matthaeus, the current director of the NASA Delaware Space Grant Consortium", who has made key contributions to the field including involvement in the Parker Solar Probe. Delaware's Space Grant Consortium was founded in 1991 under the leadership of Norman F. Ness. Shortly before Norman Ness became the third Bartol Director, he was elected to the National Academy of Sciences for his seminal contributions to measuring planetary and interplanetary magnetic fields. In particular, he is the principal investigator of the magnetometer of NASA's Voyager program.

Last but not least, the present research portfolio of Bartol also includes various areas of astronomy, in particular, stellar and planetary astrophysics.

Since 1985, the Bartol Research Institute has awarded the Shakti P. Duggal Award to a young scientist in cosmic-ray physics at each occurrence of the biannual International Cosmic Ray Conference.

== History ==
Founded in 1924 by the endowment of Henry W. Bartol at the Franklin Institute in Philadelphia, PA, as the Bartol Research Foundation, it moved to its own building at the Swarthmore College in 1927 where it resided for fifty years. The research was also supported by grants from the federal government of the USA, and the research topics included nuclear physics, cosmic rays, astrophysics, and the physics and chemistry of surfaces. The Bartol Research Foundation was also active in public outreach, e.g., by a contribution to the 1939 New York World's Fair.

In 1977 the Bartol Research Foundation relocated to its present location in the Sharp Lab building on the main campus of the University of Delaware in Newark, and later changed its name to the Bartol Research Institute. The integration of the Bartol Research Institute into the Department of Physics and Astronomy at the University of Delaware was completed in the year 2005, and the institute celebrated its centennial in 2024. The Bartol Research Foundation (later the Bartol Research Institute) and its researchers issued numerous scientific publications, and hosted conferences.

=== List of directors ===
- William Francis Gray Swann (1927–1959)
- Martin A. Pomerantz (1959–1987)
- Norman F. Ness (1987–2000)
- Stuart Pittel (2000–2011)
- Stephen Matthew Barr (2011–2019)
- Jamie Holder (2019–)
