= Qaisar Shafi =

Theoretical physicist

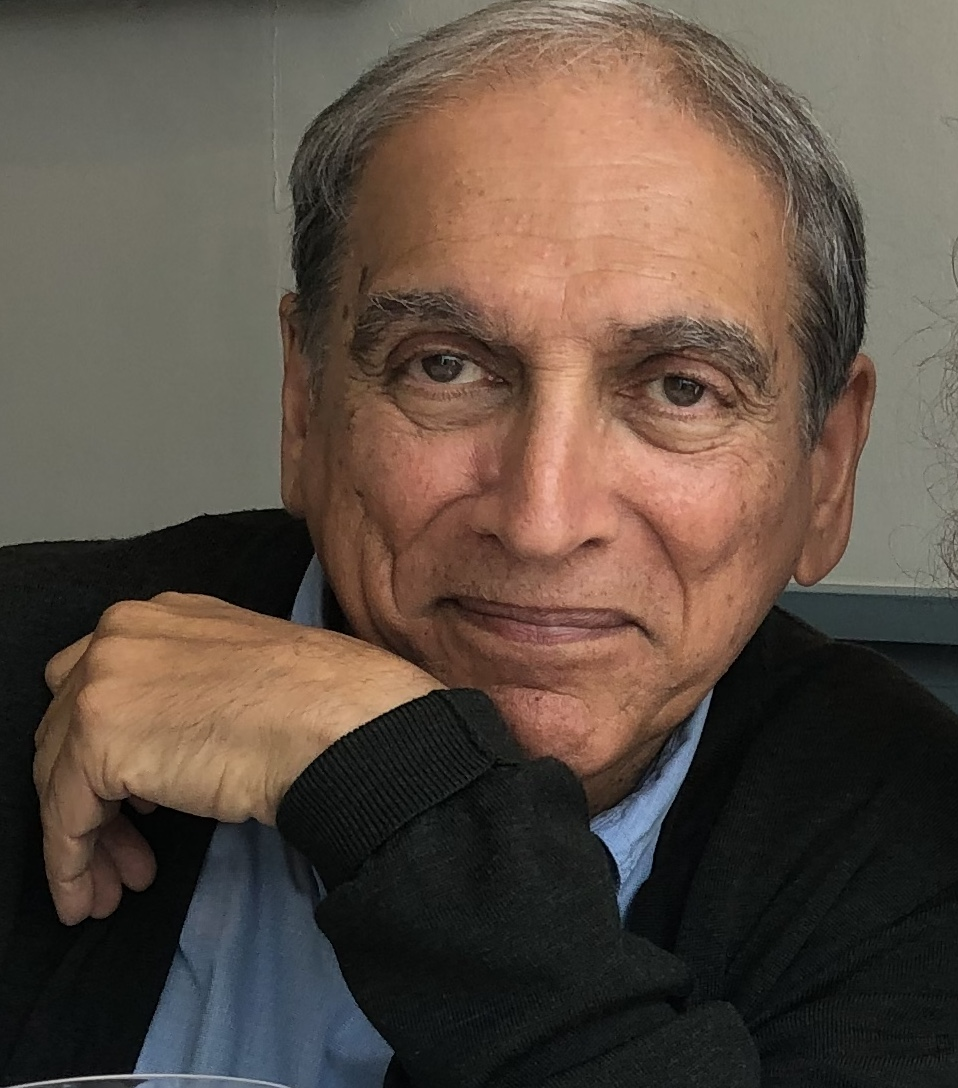
- Education: Imperial College
- Awards: Fellow of the American Physical Society; Alexander von Humboldt Prize (1997)
- Scientific career
- Fields: Theoretical Physics, Cosmology
- Doctoral advisor: Abdus Salam

Qaisar Shafi is a British-American theoretical physicist and Distinguished Professor of Physics and Astronomy Emeritus at the University of Delaware.

== Biography ==
After graduating as valedictorian from Holland Park School, London, UK, he studied physics at Imperial College, London, where he received both his B.Sc. Honors and PhD. His PhD advisor was the late Nobel Laureate Professor Abdus Salam, whom he subsequently joined at the International Centre for Theoretical Physics (ICTP) in Trieste, Italy. Shafi was awarded an Alexander von Humboldt Prize and spent some years in Germany (Munich, Aachen, and Freiburg). In 1978, he received his Habilitation with Venia Legendi from the University of Freiburg. He then spent two years at CERN (Geneva, Switzerland) after which he moved to the United States. Since 1983, Shafi has been a faculty member at the Bartol Research Institute, University of Delaware, which in 2005 merged with the Department of Physics and Astronomy.

Shafi has done pioneering research in areas ranging from Grand Unification to Kaluza-Klein theories, to inflationary cosmology and supersymmetric theories, and he is widely regarded as a leader in these fields. He has published more than 300 papers in refereed journals, among them many of the most prestigious in the field, lectured at close to 250 conferences, workshops, and universities.

== Research Work ==
Contemporary high energy physics could be subdivided into the energy frontier, the cosmic frontier and the intensity frontier. Shafi, whose work is highly interdisciplinary, has made pioneering contributions in all three areas. Shafi’s work has focused on Grand Unified Theories (GUTs), Yukawa coupling unification, dark matter and collider physics, inflationary cosmology, topological defects, thermal inflation, superstring phenomenology and related topics. His pioneering works include:

- Discovery of stable cosmic strings with Sir Tom Kibble and George Lazarides in Grand Unified Theories
- Discovery of discrete Z_2 symmetry in SO (10) with Sir Tom Kibble and George Lazarides. This gauge Z_2 symmetry plays a critical role in explaining why the dark matter in the universe is stable.
- Discovery of topological defects called “walls bounded by strings” with Sir Tom Kibble and George Lazarides. These topological structures were discovered recently in superfluid ^{3}He and are called Kibble-Lazarides-Shafi (KLS) walls.
- Discovery of type II seesaw mechanism with George Lazarides and Christof Wetterich in Grand Unified Theories
- Discovery that axionic strings are superconducting with George Lazarides
- Pioneering paper with George Lazarides on non-thermal leptogenesis in inflationary cosmology
- Discovery of Yukawa unification in supersymmetric GUTs with Balasubramanian Ananthanarayan and George Lazarides
- Novel mechanism (Lazarides-Shafi mechanism) for solving the axion domain wall problem
- D-brane inflation with Giorgi Dvali and Sviatoslav Solganik
- Shafi-Vilenkin Inflationary Model
- Fermion mass hierarchies in five dimensional models with Stephan Huber
- Supersymmetric Hybrid Inflation with Giorgi Dvali and Robert Schaefer

== Outreach Work ==
Shafi has done also extensive outreach work for the scientific community. From the early 1980s until 1997, he organized/co-organized several weeks long summer schools at the International Centre for Theoretical Physics in Trieste. For more than fifteen years, Shafi was one of the key organizers for each summer school.

In addition, he was also one of the principal organizers of the BCVSPIN (acronym denoting the countries Bangladesh-China-Vietnam-Sri Lanka-Pakistan-India-Nepal) schools, which he co-founded in 1989 with Professors Abdus Salam, Jogesh Pati and Yu-Lu. The concept underlying BCVSPIN was to allow young scientists living in underserved regions to engage in research. Professor Shafi organized, lectured at, and led numerous BCVSPIN schools as well as associated preparatory schools, and thus helped lay the groundwork for the successful careers of many graduate students and postdoctoral fellows while also keeping track of their progress. He directed or co-directed the BCVSPIN summer schools from 1989 to 1997 and after a hiatus of several years, caused by the shifting political climate in Nepal, single-handedly resurrected the school in 2007, organizing highly successful schools in China, Vietnam and also branching out to Mexico.

In 2025, Qaisar Shafi received the Spirit of Salam Award for his longstanding contributions to Abdus Salam’s vision, including his role in the BCVSPIN initiative to promote high-energy physics in South and Southeast Asia and his support for the Qaiser and Monika Shafi Prize for Diploma students.

== Personal life ==
Qaisar Shafi is married to Monika Shafi, the Elias Ahuja Professor Emerita of German Literature at the University of Delaware. They have a daughter and a son.
