= Norman F. Ness =

American geophysicist (1933–2023)

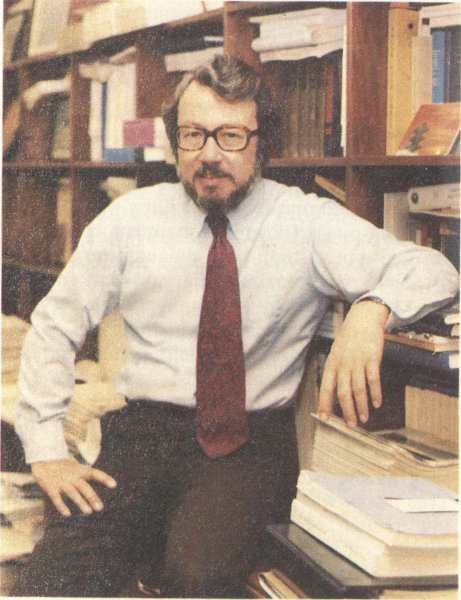
- Ness in c. 1980
- Born: April 15, 1933; Springfield, Massachusetts, U.S.
- Died: December 4, 2023 (aged 90); Venice, Florida, U.S.
- Education: Massachusetts Institute of Technology
- Scientific career
- Fields: Geophysics
- Workplaces: Goddard Space Flight Center; Bartol Research Institute
- Thesis: Resistivity interpretation in geophysical prospecting (1959)
- Doctoral advisor: Theodore R. Madden

Norman Frederick Ness (April 15, 1933 – December 4, 2023) was an American geophysicist.

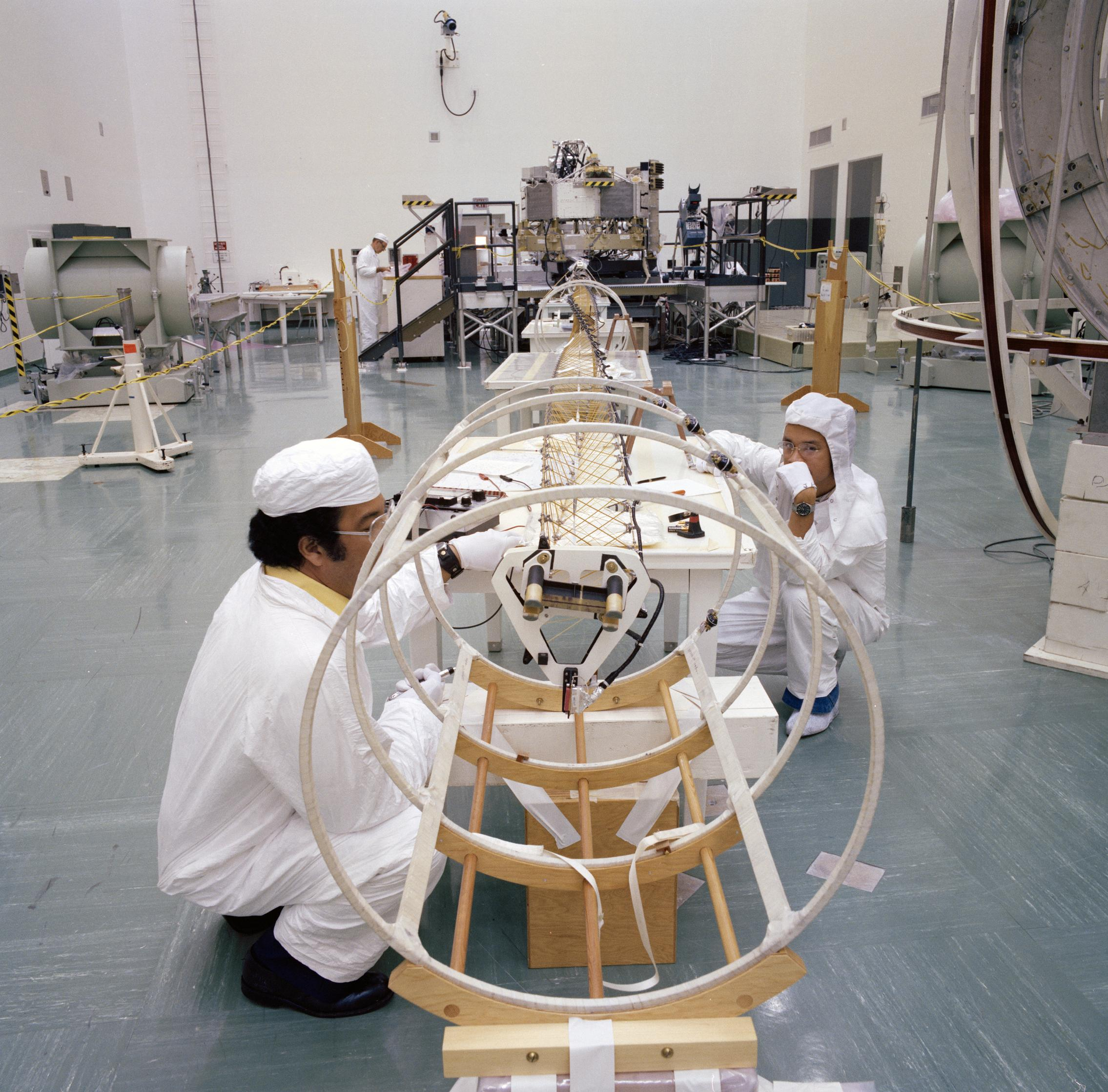
Deployed magnetometer boom of one of NASA's Voyager spacecraft

== Biography ==
Ness was born 15 April 1933 in Springfield, Massachusetts and grew up in Meriden, Connecticut. He received a BSc (1955) and a PhD (1959) in geophysics at Massachusetts Institute of Technology. He joined NASA Goddard center in 1960, and soon became the principal investigator of the magnetometer experiments on the Interplanetary Monitoring Platform satellites. He directed the Explorer 35 Moon mission, and became involved into planetary science. He designed magnetometers for Pioneer 11 and for twin Voyager program spacecraft. Pioneer 11 discovered the magnetic field of Saturn; Voyager 2 discovered magnetic fields of Uranus and Neptune.

Together with John M. Wilcox, Ness discovered the heliospheric current sheet in 1965.

From 1966 to 1986 he was director of the Laboratory of Extraterrestrial Physics at the NASA's Goddard Space Flight Center. In 1987, he became director of the Bartol Research Institute at the University of Delaware. He retired in 2005.

COSPAR Scientific Assembly in Warsaw, 2000. From the right: Ian W. Axford, Wim Hermsen, Ester Antonucci, and Norman F. Ness.

Ness died in Venice, Florida, on December 4, 2023, at the age of 90.

== Personal life ==
Ness was married twice and had a son and a daughter. He was a sailor and a coach for the US Naval Academy Sailing Squadron in Annapolis.

== Awards ==
- 1965 John A. Fleming Medal of the American Geophysical Union
- 1965, 1981, 1986 NASA Exceptional Scientific Achievement Medal
- 1968 Arthur S. Flemming Award
- 1972 AIAA Space Science Award
- 1975 GSFC Lindsay Memorial Award
- 1983 elected to the National Academy of Sciences
- 1993 Emil Wiechert Medal of the German Geophysical Society Award
- 1993 US National Space Club Science Award

== Selected publications ==
- MacDonald, Gordon J. F.; Ness, Norman F. (1961). "A study of the free oscillations of the Earth". Journal of Geophysical Research. 66 (6): 1865. Bibcode:1961JGR....66.1865M. doi:10.1029/JZ066i006p01865.
- Ness, Norman F.; Scearce, Clell S.; Seek, Joseph B. (1964). "Initial results of the imp 1 magnetic field experiment". Journal of Geophysical Research. 69 (17): 3531–3569. Bibcode:1964JGR....69.3531N. doi:10.1029/jz069i017p03531.
- Ness, Norman F.; Wilcox, John M. (1964). "Solar Origin of the Interplanetary Magnetic Field". Physical Review Letters. 13 (15): 461–464. Bibcode:1964PhRvL..13..461N. doi:10.1103/PhysRevLett.13.461. hdl:2060/19650019810.
- Ness, N. F.; Wilcox, J. M. (February 1965), Extension of the photospheric magnetic field into interplanetary space
- Ness, Norman F. (1965). "The Earth's magnetic tail". Journal of Geophysical Research. 70 (13): 2989–3005. Bibcode:1965JGR....70.2989N. doi:10.1029/JZ070i013p02989.
- Wilcox, John M.; Ness, Norman F. (1965). "Quasi-stationary corotating structure in the interplanetary medium". Journal of Geophysical Research. 70 (23): 5793–5805. Bibcode:1965JGR....70.5793W. doi:10.1029/JZ070i023p05793.
- Ness, N. F.; Behannon, K. W.; Scearce, C. S.; Cantarano, S. C. (1967). "Early results from the magnetic field experiment on lunar Explorer 35". Journal of Geophysical Research. 72 (23): 5769–5778. Bibcode:1967JGR....72.5769N. doi:10.1029/JZ072i023p05769. hdl:2060/19670022481.
- Speiser, T. W.; Ness, N. F. (1967). "The neutral sheet in the geomagnetic tail: Its motion, equivalent currents, and field line connection through it". Journal of Geophysical Research. 72 (1): 131. Bibcode:1967JGR....72..131S. doi:10.1029/JZ072i001p00131. hdl:2060/19670002035.
- Ness, N. F.; Behannon, K. W.; Taylor, H. E.; Whang, Y. C. (1968). "Perturbations of the interplanetary magnetic field by the lunar wake". Journal of Geophysical Research. 73 (11): 3421–3440. Bibcode:1968JGR....73.3421N. doi:10.1029/ja073i011p03421. hdl:2060/19680007402.
- Schatten, Kenneth H.; Wilcox, John M.; Ness, Norman F. (1969). "A model of interplanetary and coronal magnetic fields". Solar Physics. 6 (3): 442–455. Bibcode:1969SoPh....6..442S. doi:10.1007/BF00146478. hdl:2060/19680019703.
- Ness, Norman F. (1969). "The geomagnetic tail". Reviews of Geophysics. 7 (1–2): 97–127. Bibcode:1969RvGSP...7...97N. doi:10.1029/RG007i001p00097. hdl:2060/19680025161.
- Burlaga, Leonard F.; Ness, Norman F. (1969). "Tangential discontinuities in the solar wind". Solar Physics. 9 (2): 467–477. Bibcode:1969SoPh....9..467B. doi:10.1007/BF02391672.
- Ness, Norman F. (1970). "Magnetometers for space research". Space Science Reviews. 11 (4): 459. Bibcode:1970SSRv...11..459N. doi:10.1007/BF00183028.
- Fairfield, D. H.; Ness, N. F. (1970). "Configuration of the geomagnetic tail during substorms". Journal of Geophysical Research. 75 (34): 7032–7047. Bibcode:1970JGR....75.7032F. doi:10.1029/JA075i034p07032.
- Ness, Norman F.; Behannon, Kenneth W.; Lepping, Ronald P.; Schatten, Kenneth H. (1971). "Use of two magnetometers for magnetic field measurements on a spacecraft". Journal of Geophysical Research. 76 (16): 3564–3573. Bibcode:1971JGR....76.3564N. doi:10.1029/JA076i016p03564. hdl:2060/19710003602.
- Ness, Norman F. (1972). "Interaction of the Solar Wind with the Moon". Solar-Terrestrial Physics/1970. Astrophysics and Space Science Library. Vol. 29. pp. 347–393. doi:10.1007/978-94-009-3693-5_21. ISBN 978-94-010-8154-2.
- Ness, N.F.; Behannon, K.W.; Lepping, R.P.; Whang, Y.C. (1976). "Observations of Mercury's magnetic field". Icarus. 28 (4): 479–488. Bibcode:1976Icar...28..479N. doi:10.1016/0019-1035(76)90121-4. hdl:2060/19760009915.
- Acuna, Mario H.; Ness, Norman F. (1976). "The main magnetic field of Jupiter". Journal of Geophysical Research. 81 (16): 2917–2922. Bibcode:1976JGR....81.2917A. doi:10.1029/JA081i016p02917.
- Ness, Norman F.; Acuña, Mario H.; Lepping, Ronald P.; Burlaga, Leonard F.; Behannon, Kenneth W.; Neubauer, Fritz M. (1979). "Magnetic Field Studies at Jupiter by Voyager 1: Preliminary Results". Science. 204 (4396): 982–987. Bibcode:1979Sci...204..982N. doi:10.1126/science.204.4396.982. PMID 17800435.
- Ness, Norman F.; Acuna, Mario H.; Lepping, Ronald P.; Burlaga, Leonard F.; Behannon, Kenneth W.; Neubauer, Fritz M. (1979). "Magnetic Field Studies at Jupiter by Voyager 2: Preliminary Results". Science. 206 (4421): 966–972. Bibcode:1979Sci...206..966N. doi:10.1126/science.206.4421.966. hdl:2060/19790025967. PMID 17733916.
- Acuña, Mario H.; Ness, Norman F. (1980). "The Magnetic Field of Saturn: Pioneer 11 Observations". Science. 207 (4429): 444–446. Bibcode:1980Sci...207..444A. doi:10.1126/science.207.4429.444. PMID 17833558.
- Ness, Norman F.; Acuña, Mario H.; Lepping, Ronald P.; Connerney, John E. P.; Behannon, Kenneth W.; Burlaga, Leonard F.; Neubauer, Fritz M. (1981). "Magnetic Field Studies by Voyager 1: Preliminary Results at Saturn". Science. 212 (4491): 211–217. Bibcode:1981Sci...212..211N. doi:10.1126/science.212.4491.211. PMID 17783832.
- Ness, Norman F.; Acuna, Mario H.; Behannon, Kenneth W.; Neubauer, Fritz M. (1982). "The induced magnetosphere of Titan". Journal of Geophysical Research: Space Physics. 87 (A3): 1369–1381. Bibcode:1982JGR....87.1369N. doi:10.1029/JA087iA03p01369.
- Ness, Norman F.; Acuña, Mario H.; Behannon, Kenneth W.; Burlaga, Leonard F.; Connerney, John E. P.; Lepping, Ronald P.; Neubauer, Fritz M. (1986). "Magnetic Fields at Uranus". Science. 233 (4759): 85–89. Bibcode:1986Sci...233...85N. doi:10.1126/science.233.4759.85. PMID 17812894.
- Connerney, J. E. P.; Acuña, Mario H.; Ness, Norman F. (1987). "The magnetic field of Uranus". Journal of Geophysical Research: Space Physics. 92 (A13): 15329–15336. Bibcode:1987JGR....9215329C. doi:10.1029/ja092ia13p15329.
- Ness, Norman F.; Acuña, Mario H.; Burlaga, Leonard F.; Connerney, John E. P.; Lepping, Ronald P.; Neubauer, Fritz M. (1989). "Magnetic Fields at Neptune". Science. 246 (4936): 1473–1478. Bibcode:1989Sci...246.1473N. doi:10.1126/science.246.4936.1473. PMID 17756002.
- Connerney, J. E. P.; Acuña, Mario H.; Ness, Norman F. (1991). "The magnetic field of Neptune". Journal of Geophysical Research: Space Physics. 96: 19023–19042. Bibcode:1991JGR....9619023C. doi:10.1029/91JA01165.
- Ness, Norman F. (1994). "Intrinsic magnetic fields of the planets: Mercury to Neptune". Philosophical Transactions of the Royal Society of London, Series A. 349 (1690): 249–260. Bibcode:1994RSPTA.349..249N. doi:10.1098/rsta.1994.0129.
- Smith, C. W.; l'Heureux, J.; Ness, N. F.; Acuña, M. H.; Burlaga, L. F.; Scheifele, J. (1998). "The Ace Magnetic Fields Experiment". The Advanced Composition Explorer Mission. pp. 613–632. doi:10.1007/978-94-011-4762-0_21. ISBN 978-94-010-6001-1.
- Leamon, Robert J.; Smith, Charles W.; Ness, Norman F.; Matthaeus, William H.; Wong, Hung K. (1998). "Observational constraints on the dynamics of the interplanetary magnetic field dissipation range". Journal of Geophysical Research: Space Physics. 103 (A3): 4775–4787. Bibcode:1998JGR...103.4775L. doi:10.1029/97JA03394.
- Connerney, J. E. P.; Acuña, M. H.; Ness, N. F.; Satoh, T. (1998). "New models of Jupiter's magnetic field constrained by the Io flux tube footprint". Journal of Geophysical Research: Space Physics. 103 (A6): 11929–11939. Bibcode:1998JGR...10311929C. doi:10.1029/97ja03726.
- Leamon, Robert J.; Smith, Charles W.; Ness, Norman F.; Wong, Hung K. (1999). "Dissipation range dynamics: Kinetic Alfvén waves and the importance of β_{e}". Journal of Geophysical Research: Space Physics. 104 (A10): 22331–22344. Bibcode:1999JGR...10422331L. doi:10.1029/1999JA900158.
- Smith, Charles W.; Matthaeus, W. H.; Zank, Gary P.; Ness, Norman F.; Oughton, Sean; Richardson, John D. (2001). "Heating of the low-latitude solar wind by dissipation of turbulent magnetic fluctuations". Journal of Geophysical Research: Space Physics. 106 (A5): 8253–8272. Bibcode:2001JGR...106.8253S. doi:10.1029/2000JA000366.
- Smith, Charles W.; Mullan, Dermott J.; Ness, Norman F.; Skoug, Ruth M.; Steinberg, John (2001). "Day the solar wind almost disappeared: Magnetic field fluctuations, wave refraction and dissipation". Journal of Geophysical Research: Space Physics. 106 (A9): 18625–18634. Bibcode:2001JGR...10618625S. doi:10.1029/2001JA000022.
- Crider, Dana H.; Vignes, Didier; Krymskii, Alexander M.; Breus, Tamara K.; Ness, Norman F.; Mitchell, David L.; Slavin, James A.; Acuña, Mario H. (2003). "A proxy for determining solar wind dynamic pressure at Mars using Mars Global Surveyor data". Journal of Geophysical Research: Space Physics. 108 (A12): 1461. Bibcode:2003JGRA..108.1461C. doi:10.1029/2003JA009875.
