= Grand Tour program =

NASA's space program intended to explore the outer solar system

Trajectories of Voyager 1 and Voyager 2

The Grand Tour is a NASA program that would have sent two groups of robotic probes to all the planets of the outer Solar System. It called for four spacecraft, two of which would visit Jupiter, Saturn, and Pluto, while the other two would visit Jupiter, Uranus, and Neptune. The enormous cost of the project, around $1 billion, led to its cancellation and replacement with Mariner Jupiter-Saturn, which became the Voyager program.

== Background ==
The concept of the Grand Tour began in 1964, when Gary Flandro of the Jet Propulsion Laboratory (JPL) noted that an alignment of Jupiter, Saturn, Uranus, and Neptune that would occur in the late 1970s would enable a single spacecraft to visit all of the outer planets by using gravity assists. The particular alignment occurs once every 175 years. By 1966, JPL was promoting the project, noting it would allow a complete survey of the outer planets in less time and for less money than sending individual probes to each planet.

== Grand Tour ==
A drawing of the Thermoelectric Outer Planets spacecraft, as of April 1, 1973. This design, while similar to Voyager, was more complex and more expensive.

In 1969, NASA created the Outer Planets Working Group, which favored the concept of two missions that would visit three planets each (including Pluto, which was considered a planet at the time). These missions were referred to as the Grand Tour. One would launch in 1977 and visit Jupiter, Saturn, and Pluto, while the other would launch in 1979 and visit Jupiter, Uranus, and Neptune. This would reduce total mission time compared to a single Grand Tour from over thirteen years to seven and a half years. The Working Group also called for the development of a new spacecraft to carry out the flyby missions. These probes, called Thermoelectric Outer Planets Spacecraft (TOPS), were being designed at JPL and featured an operational life of over ten years.

The plan was set out in a report by 23 scientists, released on August 3, 1969. The study panel was co-chaired by James A. Van Allen of the University of Iowa and Gordon J. F. MacDonald of the University of California, Santa Barbara. President Nixon gave White House support to the concept in a statement released on March 7, 1970.

By 1971, the estimated cost of Grand Tour was $750 to $900 million, plus over $100 million to launch the spacecraft. Congressional pressure, combined with internal competition from the recently approved Space Shuttle program, led to the decision to cancel the project in December 1971. The Grand Tour and TOPS were replaced with a proposal to visit only two planets using a pair of Mariner-derived probes.

== Mariner Jupiter-Saturn ==
The Mariner Jupiter-Saturn project was approved in early 1972, with an estimated cost of less than $360 million for each of two probes. The probes would be built by JPL, with the intention that they would last long enough to complete the original Grand Tour of the four giant planets, but be advertised as missions to only Jupiter and Saturn to reduce estimated total project costs.

The probes were to visit Jupiter, Saturn, and Saturn's moon Titan. Titan was a valuable target, as it was the only moon known to have an atmosphere, and a flyby would gather information that would not otherwise be obtainable, including the density, composition, and temperature of the atmosphere.

Two trajectories were selected. One was designated JST: its mission would take it to Jupiter, Saturn, and Titan, with the probe's trajectory designed to optimize the Titan flyby. The second was designated JSX: it would be launched on a trajectory that would preserve the option of a Grand Tour, while serving as backup for the first probe. It would arrive after JST, and if JST were successful, it could continue with the Grand Tour. If JST was unsuccessful, JSX could be diverted to perform the Titan flyby itself, which would eliminate the possibility of a Grand Tour.

In March 1977, just a few months before launch, NASA held a competition to rename the project.

== Voyager ==
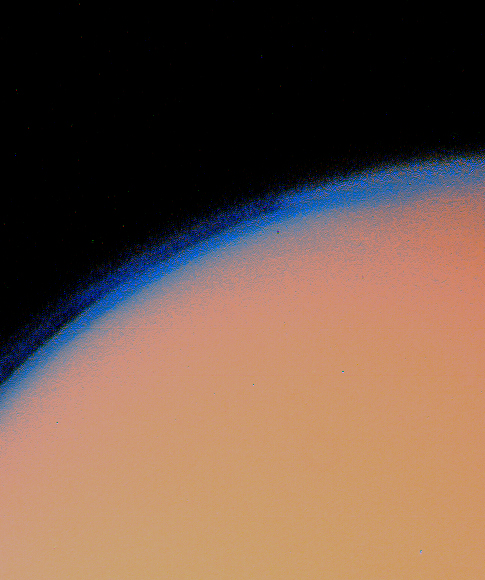
Voyager 1's view of Titan

The two spacecraft that launched retained the same mission concept. Voyager 1's course was optimized for the Titan flyby and Voyager 2 for the Grand Tour. Voyager 2 would reach Saturn nine months after Voyager 1, giving plenty of time to decide if it should proceed with the Grand Tour. Additionally, by launching Voyager 2 first, Voyager 1's launch could be re-targeted to perform the Grand Tour if Voyager 2 were lost in a launch failure. An option to skip Voyager 1's Titan flyby and proceed from Saturn to Pluto was identified, though Titan was still considered the more interesting target, especially after images from Pioneer 11 indicated a very substantial atmosphere.

Though atmospheric haze obscured any images of Titan's surface, Voyager 1's flyby obtained valuable information about the moon, including data that offered compelling evidence for the existence of liquid hydrocarbon lakes on Titan's surface. With Voyager 1's mission complete, Voyager 2 was cleared for an extended mission to Uranus and Neptune, fulfilling the goal of a Grand Tour as proposed in 1964.

== The planets originally to be visited in the Grand Tour ==
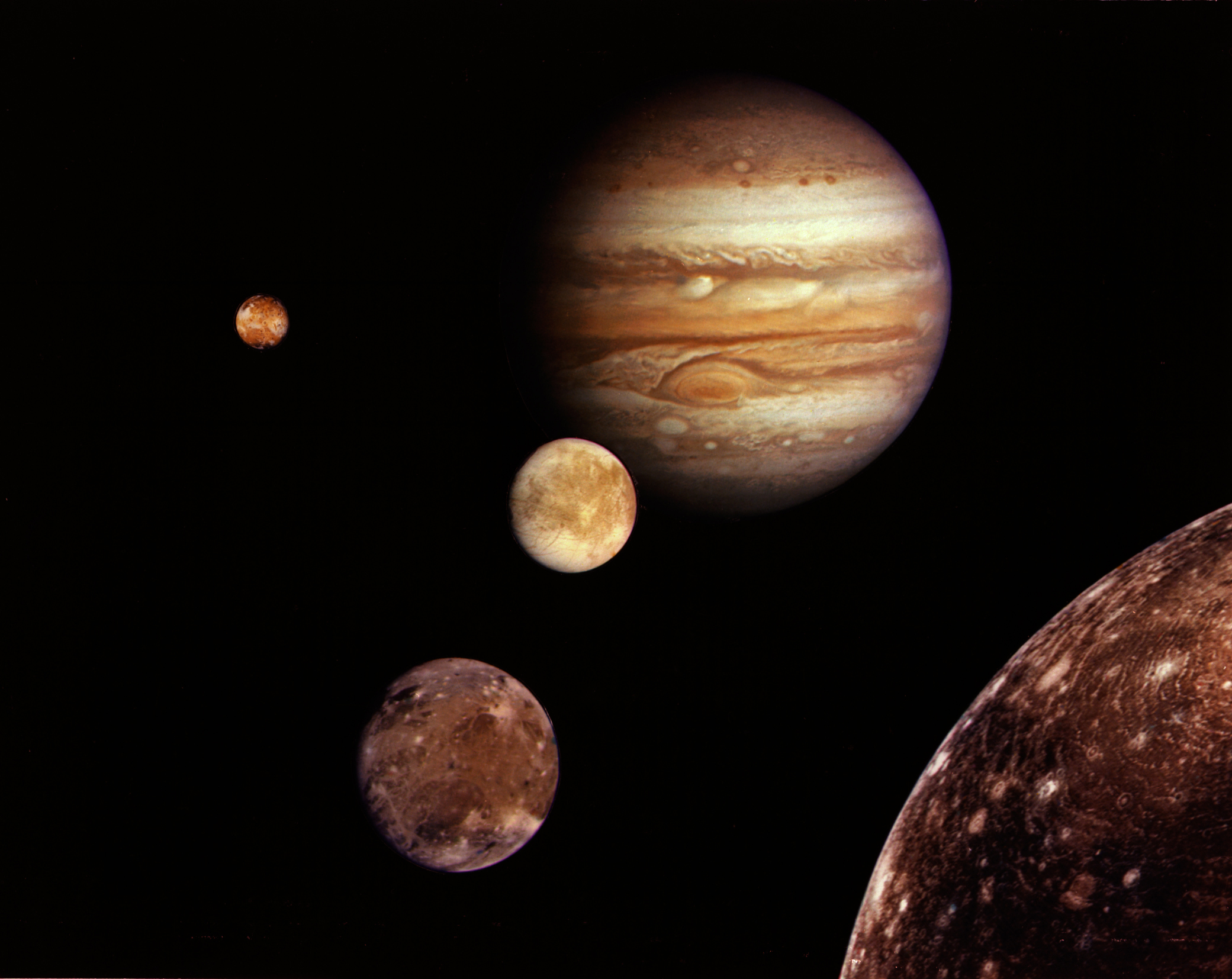
Jupiter (Voyager 1, March 1979) Note that this image is a montage of multiple pictures taken by Voyager 1, and not a single picture.

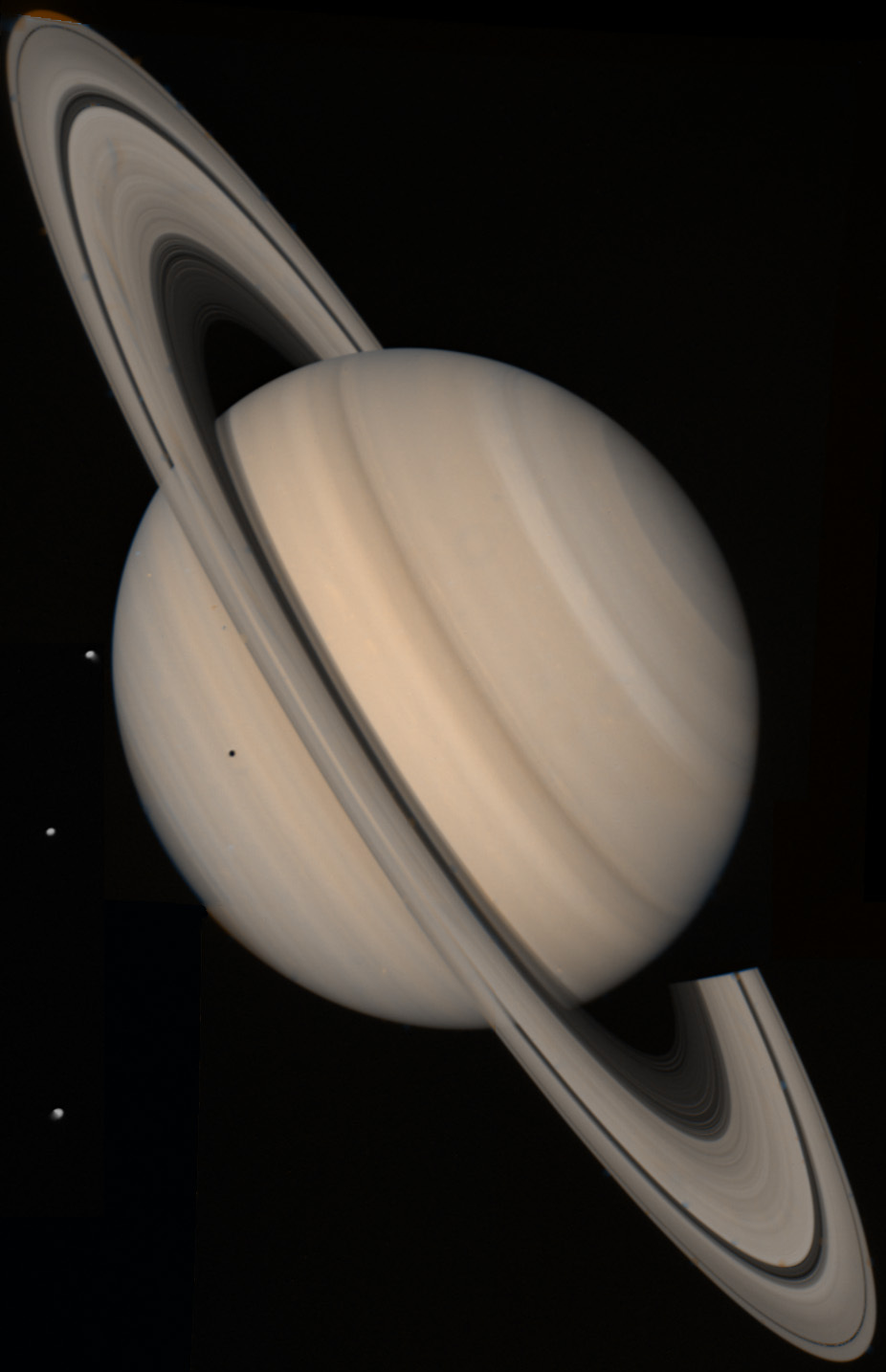
Saturn (Voyager 2, August 1981)

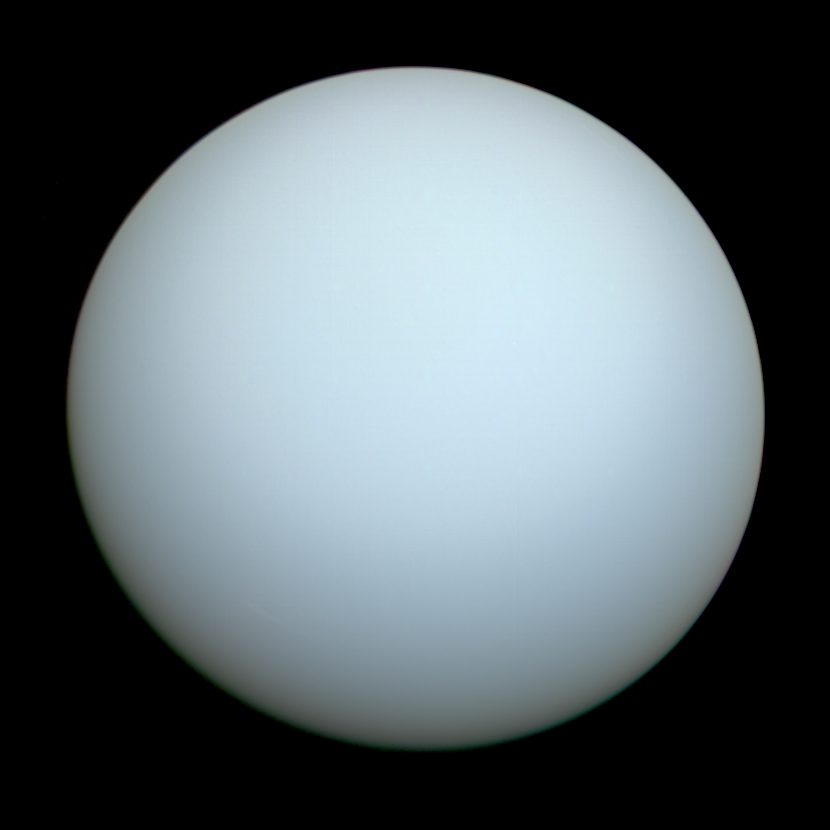
Uranus (Voyager 2, January 1986)

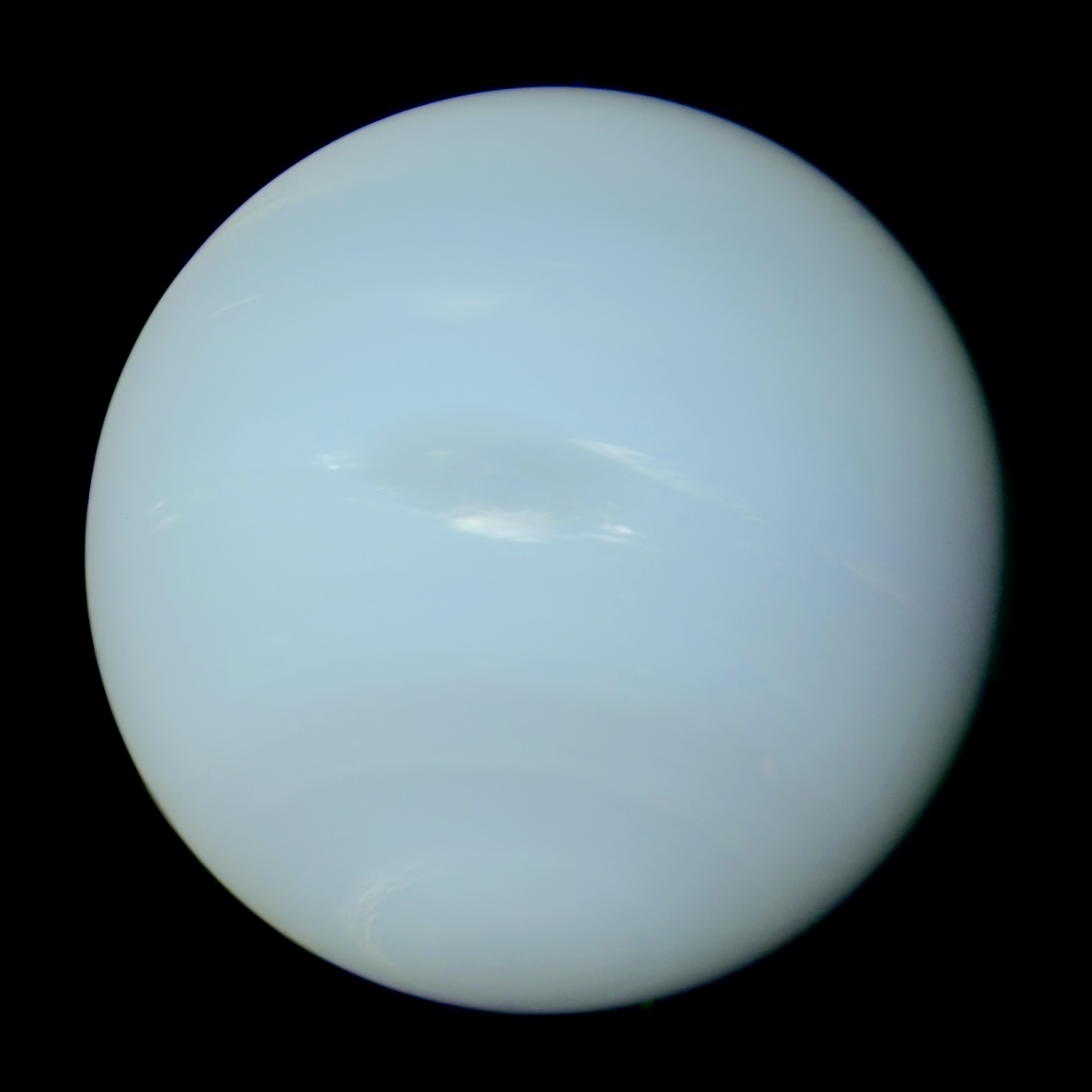
Neptune (Voyager 2, August 1989)

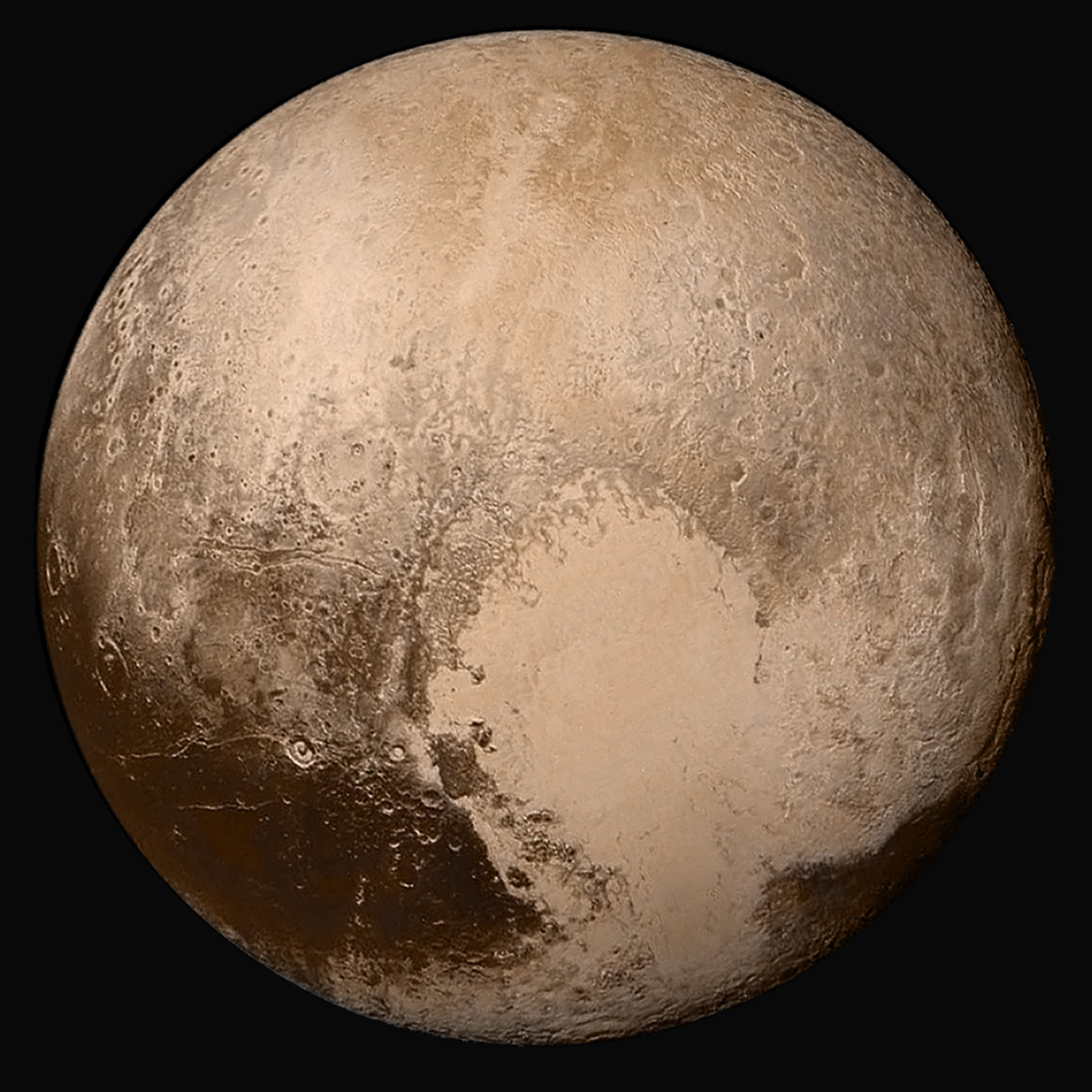
Pluto (image from New Horizons mission, July 2015)

Note: Pluto was still classified as a planet when the Grand Tour was proposed and at the time New Horizons was launched.

== See also ==
- Interplanetary Transport Network
