= Sébastien Candel =

French physicist (born 1946)

- Born: 21 April 1946 (age 80); France
- Education: École Centrale Paris; California Institute of Technology
- Occupation: President of the French Academy of Sciences (since 2017)
- Scientific career
- Fields: Physics
- Thesis: Analytical studies of some acoustic problems of jet engines (1971)
- Doctoral advisor: Frank E. Marble

Sébastien Candel (born 21 April 1946) is a French physicist, Emeritus Professor of École Centrale Paris.

He was elected a member of the National Academy of Engineering in 2009 for significant contributions to solving multidisciplinary problems in the fields of combustion, fluid mechanics, aeroacoustics, and propulsion.

Candel was the president of the French Academy of Sciences from 2017 to 2018.

== Education ==
Candel studied plasma physics at the École Centrale Paris, where he graduated with a master's degree in engineering science (Diplôme d'Ingénieur) and DEA (Diplôme d'Études Approfondies) in 1968. He subsequently received his PhD from the California Institute of Technology under the supervision of the famous aeronautical scientist Frank E. Marble and Pierre and Marie Curie University, in 1972 and 1977 respectively.

His areas of expertise include fluid mechanics, combustion, propulsion, acoustics and aeroacoustics, signal processing, and hypersonics.

== Positions ==
- 1994-2002 : Member of the advisory board of ONERA
- 2002-2004 : President of the supersonic aircraft research group at ONERA
- Since 2007 : Member of the advisory board of AERES
- Since 2010 : Member of the advisory board of CNRS
- Member of the advisory board of the French Institute of Petroleum
- 2005-2009 : President of the French National Committee for Mechanics
- Head of combustion research at EM2C Laboratory (École Centrale Paris, CNRS)
- Since 2011 : Full member of the French Academy of Sciences
- Founding member of the French Academy of Technologies
- 2015-2016 : Vice President of the French Academy of Sciences
- 2017-2018 : President of the French Academy of Sciences
- 1978-2014 : Professor at École Centrale Paris
- 2001-2011 : Member of the Institut Universitaire de France
- Visiting Professor at Caltech, Stanford, UCLA, UC Berkeley

== Contributions ==
His academic contributions include:

- More than 190 peer-reviewed journals
- Sections for 40 books
- 200 scientific papers
- Author of Mécanique des fluides et Problèmes de mécanique des fluides (Dunod)
- Co-author of Turbulent mixing and Combustion (Kluwer).

Candel was also Vice President of the Combustion Institute from 1996 to 2002, and associate editor for Combustion and Flame from 2001 to 2008.

== Distinctions ==
- Graduate engineer of the École Centrale Paris (1968)
- Prix d'Aumale, French Academy of Sciences (1987)
- Knight (1993), Officer (1998), and Commander (2012) of the Palmes Académiques
- Silver Medal, CNRS (1993)
- Knight (2000) and Officer (2016) of the Legion of Honour
- Marcel Dassault Grand Prize, French Academy of Sciences (2000)
- Aeroacoustics Award, Council of European Aerospace Societies (2004)
- Pendray Aerospace Literature Award, American Institute of Aeronautics and Astronautics (2005)
- AIAA Fellow (2005)
- Fellow of Institute of Physics, UK (2004)
- Emeritus Member of AAAF (2004)
- Honorary Doctorate, Université libre de Bruxelles (2005)
- Officer of the National Order of Merit (2006)
- Foreign Member of the National Academy of Engineering, USA (2009)
- Silver medal of the Combustion Institute for an outstanding paper presented at the 32nd Symposium (2010)
- Zeldovich Gold Medal of the Combustion Institute for outstanding contributions to the theory of combustion (2010)
- Member of the Académie de l'Air et de l'Espace (2012)
- Distinguished Alumni Award, California Institute of Technology (2013)
