= University of Tennessee Space Institute =

Satellite campus of the University of Tennessee near Tullahoma

Coordinates: 35.319°N 86.101°W

- Motto: Per aspera ad astra
- Motto in English: "through difficulties to the stars"
- Type: Public
- Established: 1964
- Endowment: US$200 million+
- Associate Executive Director: Dr. James Simonton
- Faculty: 50+
- Postgraduates: 100+
- Location: Tullahoma, Tennessee, U.S.
- Campus: Rural
- Website: UTSI.edu

The University of Tennessee Space Institute (UTSI) is a satellite campus of the University of Tennessee located near Tullahoma, Tennessee.

UTSI was founded to allow students to take advantage of the aerospace facilities located in the Arnold Engineering Development Center on Arnold Air Force Base, including wind tunnels and other laboratory equipment. Currently, the research activities conducted at UTSI are largely through the Mechanical, Aerospace, and Biomedical Engineering department.

== History ==
UTSI was founded in the aftermath of World War II and in the midst of the Cold War. The seeds that ultimately led to UTSI began in the 1930s. German aeronautical superiority resulted in German fielding of the first jet propelled aircraft and ballistic missiles, thus proving the need for research facilities devoted to the study of aeronautics and related sciences. Had the German manufacturing capability been equivalent to that of the United States, the outcome of World War II would no doubt have been different.

President Harry Truman vowed in 1951 that, "Never again will the United States ride the coattails of other countries in the progress and development of the aeronautical art."

In the wake of World War II and in the following decades, the military expanded its research capabilities, creating laboratories across the country, including the construction of airplane and missile air frame and propulsion systems wind tunnels and laboratories at Tullahoma. Construction of this facility, which was to be known as Arnold Engineering Development Center, began in 1950.

It was recognized that there would be difficulties in attracting scientific personnel to conduct research, or to analyze the results of testing in wind tunnels and engine test facilities. Numerous efforts were conducted while AEDC was under construction to develop a viable concept for an education and research institute that would exist in a collaborative relationship with AEDC. In 1952, an Institute of Flight Sciences was strongly recommended to foster graduate programs, lecture and symposia programs, and student research in the aeronautical sciences.

General Jimmy Doolittle, Secretary of the Air Force Donald A. Quarles, and Donald Douglas of Douglas Aircraft Company, along with NACA, MIT, and Caltech scientists supported the concept as sound and in the national interest. However, no consensus could be developed as to how to proceed and the concept was abandoned in 1959. In 1956, however, the Air Force decided it could not wait any longer and made contractual arrangements with the University of Tennessee to establish an AEDC graduate study program for center employees, using office and classroom space provided by the Air Force. Dr. Joel F. Bailey was the initial director of the UT effort, followed by Dr. Robert L. Young.

The year 1958 sent a new shock wave throughout the world when the Soviet Union orbited the Sputnik satellite. In the aftermath of this event, the National Aeronautics and Space Administration was formed. NASA initially considered absorbing AEDC, but ultimately decided to leave it with the Air Force. However, the need for space education was severely felt at AEDC, just as throughout the rest of the military and at NASA.

Few academic institutions offered engineering or refresher courses in space technology at the time. Dr. B.H. Goethert seized upon this national need and proposed to the Air Force and the State of Tennessee that a "Tennessee Aerospace Institute" be located near AEDC. As a result of Dr. Goethert's proposal, the University of Tennessee Space Institute was finally established in 1964.

UTSI played a unique role of vital importance to the US Air Force. It was founded in the wake of two technological revolutions – the development of the airplane and the development of the rocket. In the years following 1964, UTSI's faculty, students, and alumni have played critical roles in the furthering of American technological superiority in aeronautics and space arenas. UTSI continues to collaborate with AEDC to support present day Air Force pursuits.

UTSI is currently supporting the development of modern hypersonic systems with multiple federally supported research activities in the area. This research primarily focuses on experimental and computational aspects of high-speed aerothermodynamics, and makes use of the proximity of UTSI to aerospace entities in Huntsville, AL and AEDC.

In 2022, UTSI employees celebrated service awards for 2019, 2020 and 2021.

== Relationship with Knoxville campus ==
Since UTSI is part of the University of Tennessee-Knoxville, students enrolled at the Space Institute are granted degrees from the University of Tennessee-Knoxville. Furthermore, the two campuses share courses via virtual connection. The majority of faculty at UTSI are in the Mechanical, Aerospace, and Biomedical Engineering department.

UTSI is also home to many of the University of Tennessee-Knoxville's experimental aerospace testing platforms, including the following:

- A Mach 2 Blowdown Tunnel (8" x 8" Test-Section)
- A Mach 2.3 Blowdown Tunnel (6" x 6" Test-Section)
- A Mach 4 Ludwieg Tube (24" x 24" Test-Section)
- A Mach 7 Ludwieg Tube (18" x 18" Test-Section)

== Notable faculty ==
- John D. Schmisseur, B.H. Goethert Professor & Arnold Chair
- Gary Flandro
- Mary Helen Johnston
- Susan Wu

== Notable alumni ==
- Chris Hadfield
- Gregory C. Huffman
- William Oefelein

== Research aircraft ==
- Piper PA-31 Navajo
- Piper PA-32R

== Related institutions ==
- RWTH Aachen University - sister school
