= Gary Flandro =

American aerospace engineer (born 1934)

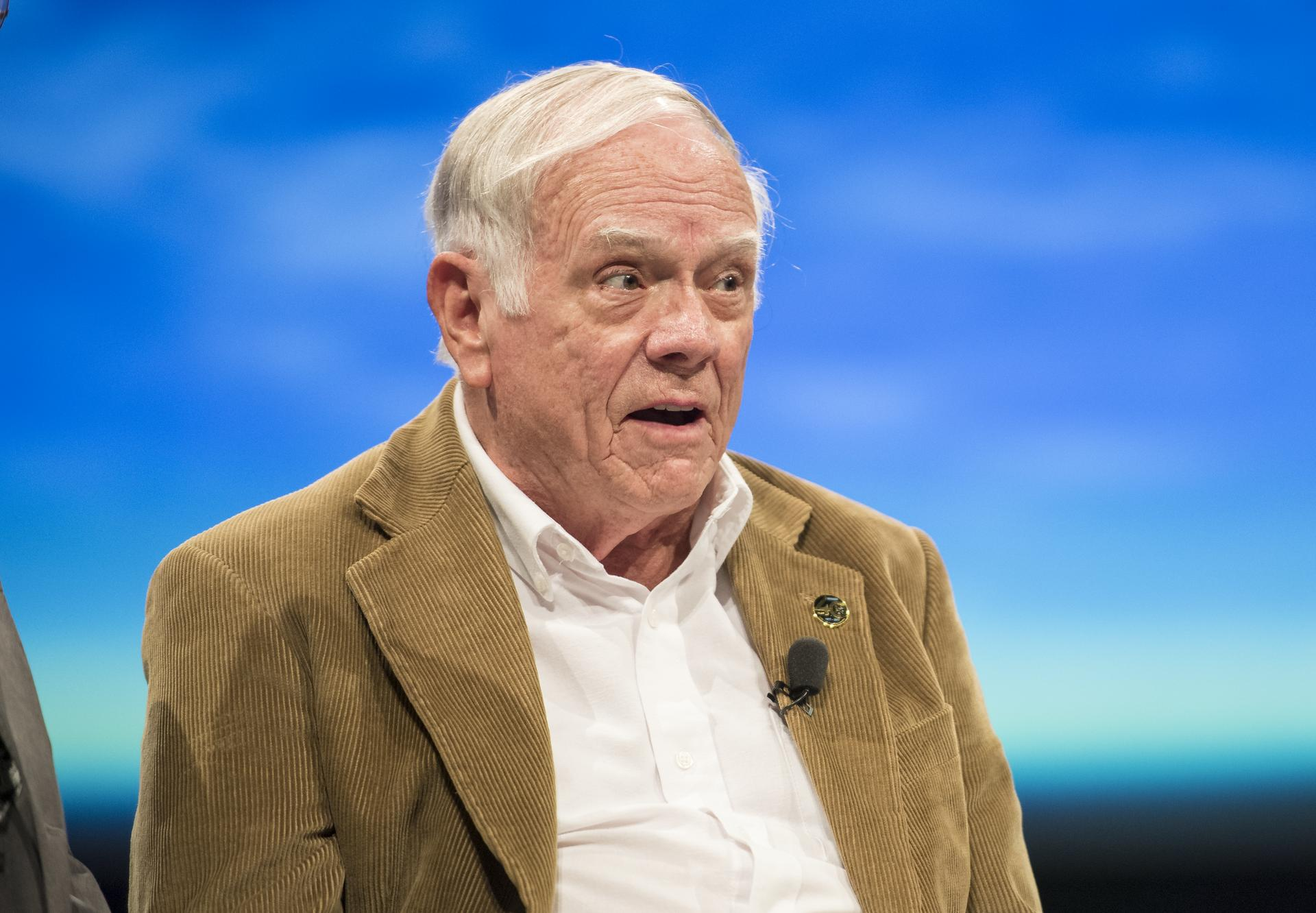
- Flandro in 2017
- Born: Gary Arnold Flandro; March 30, 1934 (age 92); Salt Lake City, Utah
- Education: University of Utah (BS 1957); Caltech (MSc 1960, PhD 1967)
- Known for: The Grand Tour program
- Scientific career
- Fields: aerospace engineering
- Workplaces: University of Utah; Georgia Tech; University of Tennessee Space Institute; Gloyer-Taylor Laboratories
- Thesis: Rotating Flows in Acoustically Unstable Rocket Motors (1967)
- Doctoral advisors: Frank E. Marble, Fred E. Culick

Gary Arnold Flandro (born March 30, 1934, in Salt Lake City, Utah) is an American aerospace engineer, best known for the discovery of planetary alignment of outer planets that made the Voyager program possible. He is the professor for the Boling Chair of Excellence in Space Propulsion (Emeritus) at the University of Tennessee Space Institute, and the Vice President and Chief Engineer for Gloyer-Taylor Laboratories.

== Biography ==
Gary Arnold Flandro was born on March 30, 1934 in Salt Lake City, Utah. He earned a BS in Mechanical Engineering from the University of Utah in 1957, an MSc (1960) and PhD (1967) in Aeronautics from the California Institute of Technology (Caltech) supervised by Frank E. Marble and Fred E. Culick, with a thesis on the "Sergeant rocket combustion instability problem and the associated roll torque puzzle".

=== The Grand Tour program ===
Trajectories of Voyager 1 and Voyager 2

In 1964, Flandro, then a summer student at Jet Propulsion Laboratory, was assigned to study possible trajectories for the outer planets mission, and found out that the rare planetary alignment of the giant planets allows a mission he called "the Grand Tour". Such alignment occurs every 175 years; Flandro calculated that the best option was to launch spacecraft in 1977. Gravity assist maneuvers were already known, but according to Flandro he was the first to notice the opportunity to visit the giant planets. Flandro himself was familiar with gravity assists through Krafft Ehricke's works and lectures. According to Flandro, many experts were sceptical and didn't believe that the mission he discovered was possible:

After we had discovered this mission design, I consulted experts at JPL to find out whether they thought we had a workable notion. They showed no interest in the outer planets and proceeded to explain the many impossibilities confronting such missions. The guidance guys said, "No, you can't guide accurately enough." The spacecraft design people said, "No, you can't build a spacecraft that would survive long enough to do this." The data people proclaimed that "You can't transmit any useful data over interplanetary distances (and think of the time delay between transmission and receipt of the signal)." Every expert I consulted had a negative response. You know, they said, "You can't get through the asteroid belt. A spacecraft cannot survive passing through the asteroid belt between Mars and Jupiter without colliding with something." Another problem voiced was that "spacecraft electronics cannot survive passage through Jupiter's magnetic field," On-and-on the negative responses built up. They declared, "You just cannot do that. Come on, kid don't bother us anymore." That inspired me to work a little bit harder on selling this whole thing."

Homer Joe Stewart published an article about Flandro's discovery in a local newspaper. It mentioned the usage of Jupiter's energy, as Flandro put it "the spacecraft speeds up, but Jupiter slows down". The article stirred some students to organize the Pasadena Society for the Preservation of Jupiter's Orbit, who then protested the JPL's idea of "messing up Jupiter's orbit", which Flandro called a great prank. In 1966, Flandro published a paper on the discovered mission and the associated gravity assists.

NASA was reluctant to finance the proposed Grand Tour mission of four spacecraft, but it eventually transformed into the smaller Voyager program of two spacecraft.

Multiple-planet trajectories to the outer solar system calculated by Flandro for the Grand Tour program
| Mission | Launch years |
|---|---|
| Earth-Jupiter-Saturn-Escape | 1976, 1977, 1978^{1} |
| Earth-Jupiter-Uranus-Escape | 1977, 1978, 1979,^{1} 1980, 1981 |
| Earth-Jupiter-Neptune-Escape | 1977, 1978, 1979,^{1} 1980, 1981 |
| Earth-Jupiter-Pluto-Escape | 1975, 1976, 1977,^{1} 1978, 1979 |
| Earth-Jupiter-Saturn-Uranus-Neptune | 1976, 1977,^{1} 1978 |

^{1}Optimum launch year.

=== Further career ===
Flandro graduated in 1967, and became an associate professor at the University of Utah. He then shifted to Georgia Tech in 1985, leaving Utah due to some administrative disagreements. Subsequently, he worked at UTSI where he occupied the Boling Chair of Excellence in Space Propulsion from 1991, until his retirement in 2009. According to Vigor Yang of the School of Aerospace Engineering of Georgia Institute of Technology, Flandro's research on combustion instability of solid rocket motors has “practically solved a challenging issue that had plagued the field for many years”.

== Awards ==
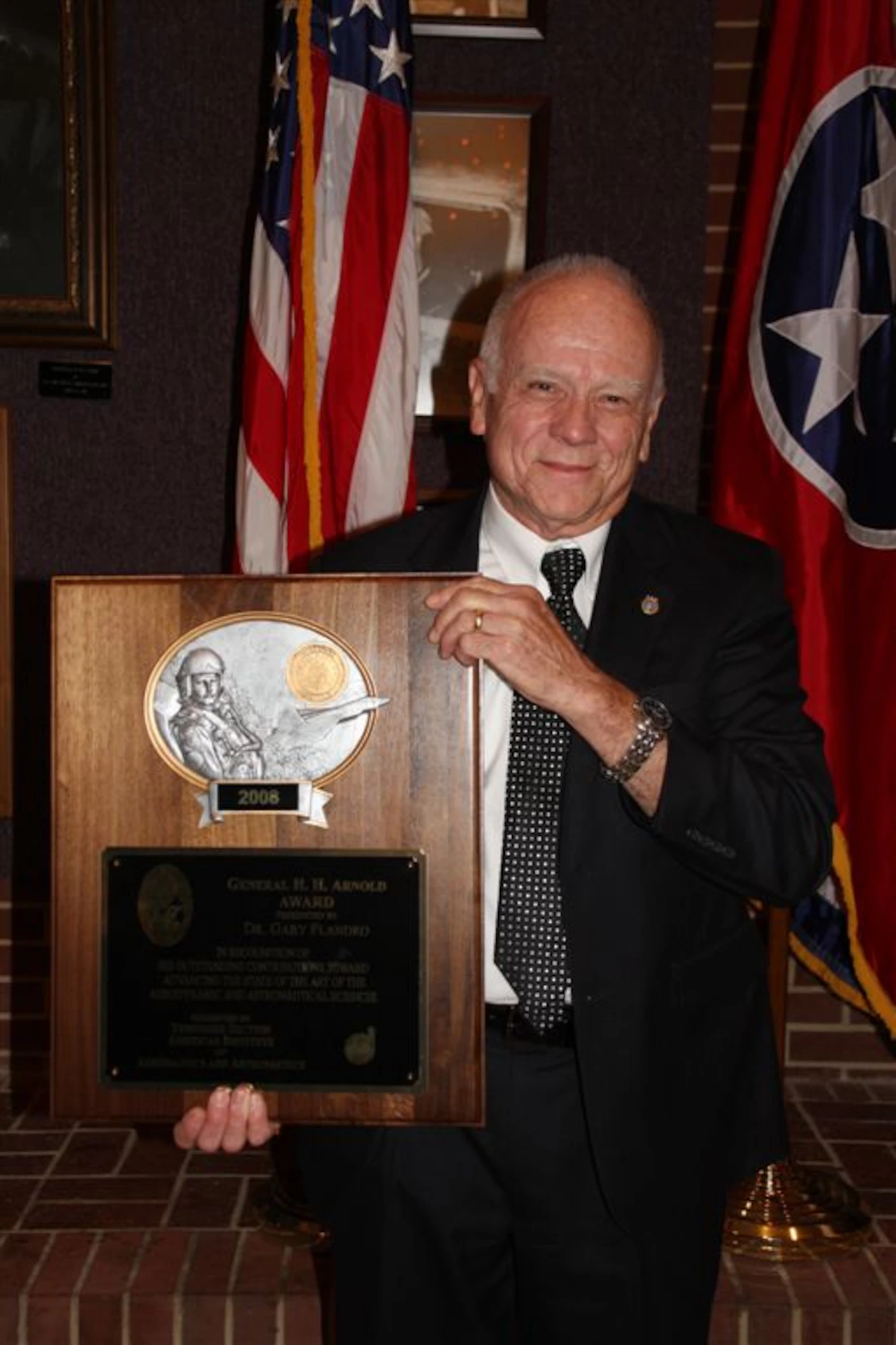
Flandro with the General Henry H. H. Arnold Award, 2008

Flandro received the British Interplanetary Society's M. N. Golovine Award in 1970 for his Grand Tour discovery, and in 1998 awarded the NASA Exceptional Achievement Medal, with the citation: "for seminal contributions to the design and engineering of multi-outer-planet missions, including the Grand Tour opportunity for the epic Voyager explorations". In 2018, he received the Caltech Distinguished Alumni Award.

He was named a Fellow of the American Institute of Aeronautics and Astronautics in 2008. In 2008, he was also awarded the General Henry H. H. Arnold Award.

== Personal life ==
Flandro is married and lives in Tullahoma. He has three sons; one of his sons, Tom, is working for Boeing as a composite structures engineer on the Boeing 787 Dreamliner.

== Selected publications ==
Grand Tour

- Flandro, Gary (1966). "Fast Reconnaissance Missions to the Outer Solar System Using Energy Derived from the Gravitational Field of Jupiter" (PDF). Astronautica Acta. 12: 329–337.
- Flandro, Gary (1988). "Discovery of the Grand Tour Voyager Mission Profile". In Mark Littman (ed.). Planets Beyond. Discovering the Outer Solar System (PDF). pp. 95–98. Archived from the original (PDF) on 22 July 2016.
- Flandro, Gary (2001). "From instrumented comets to grand tours - on the history of gravity assist". 39th Aerospace Sciences Meeting and Exhibit. doi:10.2514/6.2001-176.

Rocket propulsion

- Majdalani, Joseph; Flandro, Gary A. (2002). "The oscillatory pipe flow with arbitrary wall injection". Proceedings of the Royal Society of London. Series A: Mathematical, Physical and Engineering Sciences. 458 (2023): 1621–1651. Bibcode:2002RSPSA.458.1621M. doi:10.1098/rspa.2001.0930.
- Majdalani, Joseph; Vyas, Anand B.; Flandro, Gary A. (2002). "Higher Mean-Flow Approximation for Solid Rocket Motors with Radially Regressing Walls". AIAA Journal. 40 (9): 1780–1788. Bibcode:2002AIAAJ..40.1780M. doi:10.2514/2.1854.
- Flandro, Gary A.; Majdalani, Joseph (2003). "Aeroacoustic Instability in Rockets". AIAA Journal. 41 (3): 485–497. Bibcode:2003AIAAJ..41..485F. doi:10.2514/2.1971.
- Flandro, Gary; Sims, Joseph; Majdalani, Joseph (2004). "Nonlinear Longitudinal Mode Instability in Liquid Propellant Rocket Engine Preburners". 40th AIAA/ASME/SAE/ASEE Joint Propulsion Conference and Exhibit. doi:10.2514/6.2004-4162. hdl:2060/20040085982. ISBN 978-1-62410-037-6.
- Flandro, Gary A.; Fischbach, Sean R.; Majdalani, Joseph (2007). "Nonlinear rocket motor stability prediction: Limit amplitude, triggering, and mean pressure shift". Physics of Fluids. 19 (9): 094101–094101–16. Bibcode:2007PhFl...19i4101F. doi:10.1063/1.2746042.
- Flandro, Gary A. (2008). "On the Oscillatory Behavior of Liquid Propellant Rockets". International Journal of Energetic Materials and Chemical Propulsion. 7 (4): 315–358. doi:10.1615/IntJEnergeticMaterialsChemProp.v7.i4.40.
- Flandro, Gary A.; McMahon, Howard M.; Roach, Robert L. (2011). Basic Aerodynamics: Incompressible Flow. Cambridge University Press. ISBN 978-1316267257.
