= Ann Karagozian =

American aerospace engineer

Ann Renee Karagozian is an aerospace engineer known for her work on combustion, fluid dynamics, advanced propulsion techniques, and transverse jets in supersonic flows. She is a distinguished professor of mechanical engineering at the University of California, Los Angeles (UCLA), where she is also the former interim vice chancellor for research, the director of the Collaborative Center for Aerospace Studies, the director of the Promise Armenian Institute, a trustee of the Institute for Defense Analyses, and a trustee of the American University of Armenia.

== Education and career ==
Karagozian is Armenian American; all four of her grandparents emigrated to the US to escape the Armenian genocide in early 20th-century Turkey. Her mother, Violet Jamgochian Karagozian, was a high school mathematics teacher, and her father, Albert Karagozian, was an accountant.

As a high school student in Los Angeles, Karagozian was able to take classes in both engineering and Armenian literature at UCLA. She graduated summa cum laude from UCLA in 1978, majoring in engineering, and earned a Ph.D. from the California Institute of Technology (Caltech) in 1982. Her dissertation, An Analytical Study of Diffusion Flames in Vortex Structures, was supervised by Frank E. Marble; she was Marble's only female student, and became the first woman to complete a doctorate in mechanical engineering at Caltech.

On completing her doctorate, she returned to UCLA as an assistant professor. She was promoted to full professor in 1993 and named a distinguished professor in 2016. She served as interim vice chancellor for research for 2016–2017, and became the inaugural director of the Promise Armenian Institute in 2020.

She has been a trustee of the Institute for Defense Analyses since 2011, and of the American University of Armenia since 2012. She has served on the United States Air Force Scientific Advisory Board several times beginning in 1997, and was vice chair of the board from 2005 to 2009. She has also served the American Physical Society as division chair for the division of fluid dynamics.

== Recognition ==
Karagozian was named a Fellow of the American Physical Society (APS) in 2004, after a nomination by the APS Division of Fluid Dynamics, "for extensive contributions in the fluid mechanics of combustion systems, including the study of jets in crossflow, strained flames distorted by complex flows, acoustically driven reactive cavity flows, and detonation phenomena". She is also a Fellow of the American Institute of Aeronautics and Astronautics (elected 2004) and of the American Society of Mechanical Engineers (elected 2013). She was elected to the National Academy of Engineering in 2018 "for contributions to combustion and propulsion, education of future aerospace engineers, and service to the country".

She was awarded the Department of the Air Force Decoration for Exceptional Civilian Service twice, in 2001 and 2010.
