= Voyager program =

Ongoing NASA interstellar program

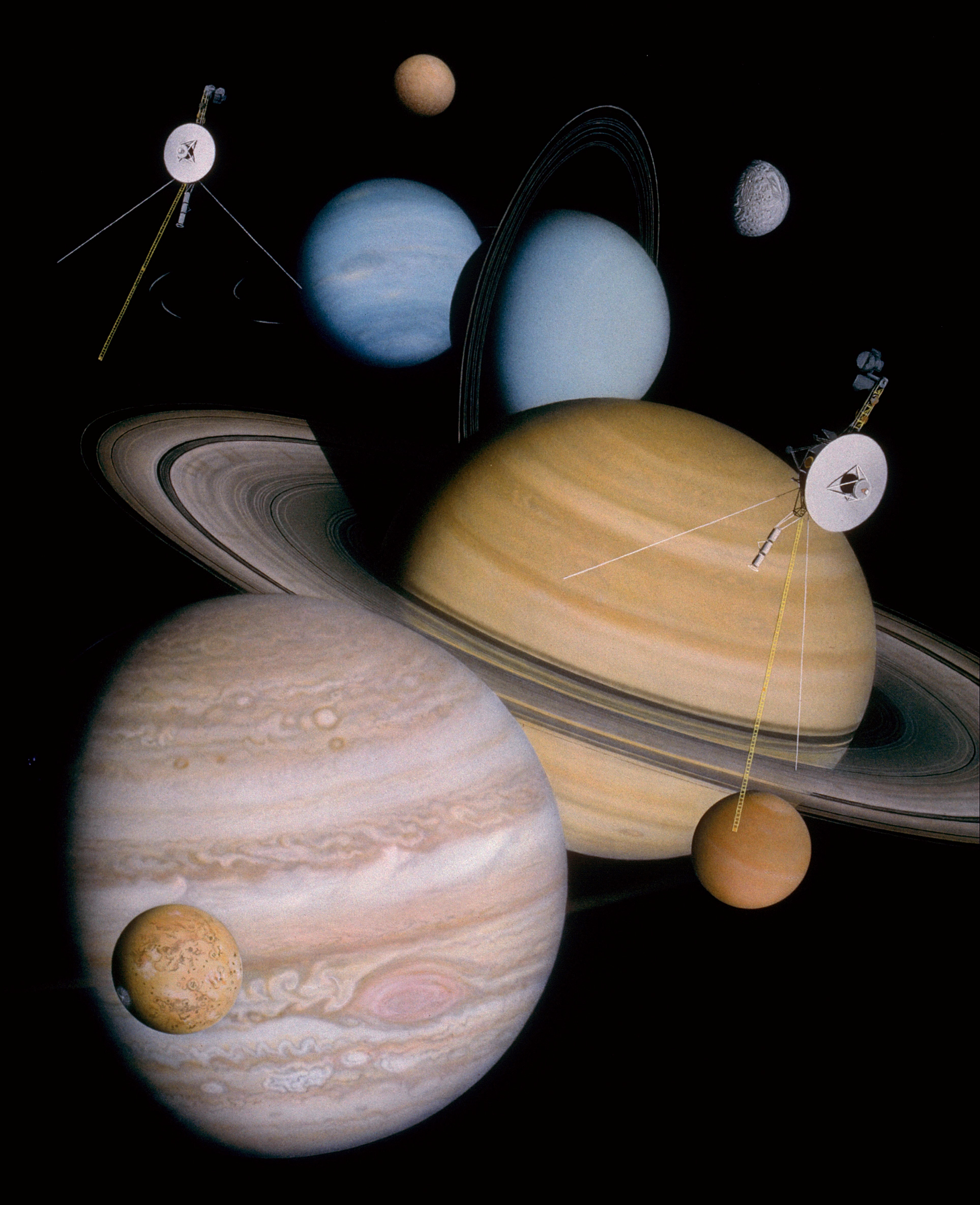
A poster of the planets and moons visited during the Voyager program.

The Voyager program is an American scientific program that employs two interstellar probes, Voyager 1 and Voyager 2. They were launched in 1977 to take advantage of a favorable planetary alignment to explore the two gas giants Jupiter and Saturn and potentially also the ice giants, Uranus and Neptune—to fly near them while collecting data for transmission back to Earth. After Voyager 1 successfully completed its flyby of Saturn and its moon Titan, it was decided that Voyager 2 would continue on its pre-planned trajectory to fly by Uranus and Neptune.

After the planetary flybys were complete, decisions were made to keep the probes in operation to explore interstellar space and the outer regions of the Solar System. On 25 August 2012, data from Voyager 1 indicated that it had entered interstellar space. On 5 November 2019, data from Voyager 2 indicated that it also had entered interstellar space. On 4 November 2019, scientists reported that on 5 November 2018, the Voyager 2 probe had officially reached the interstellar medium (ISM), a region of outer space beyond the influence of the solar wind, as did Voyager 1 in 2012. In August 2018, NASA confirmed, based on results by the New Horizons spacecraft, the existence of a "hydrogen wall" at the outer edges of the Solar System that was first detected in 1992 by the two Voyager spacecraft.

As of 2026, both Voyagers are still in operation beyond the outer boundary of the heliosphere in interstellar space. As of 2024, Voyager 1 was moving with a velocity of 61,000 kilometers per hour (38,000 mph), or 17 km/s, (10.5 miles/second) relative to the Sun, and was 24.5 billion kilometers (164 AU) from the Sun. At the same time, Voyager 2 was moving with a velocity of 55,000 kilometers per hour (34,000 mph), or 15 km/s, relative to the Sun, and was 20.4 billion kilometers (136 AU) from the Sun.

The two Voyagers are the only human-made objects to date that have passed into interstellar space — a record they will hold until at least the 2040s — and Voyager 1 is the farthest human-made object from Earth.

== History ==
=== Mariner Jupiter-Saturn ===
The trajectories that enabled the Voyager spacecraft to visit the outer planets and achieve velocity to escape the Solar System

Plot of Voyager 2's heliocentric velocity against its distance from the Sun, illustrating the use of gravity assist to accelerate the spacecraft by Jupiter, Saturn and Uranus. To observe Triton, Voyager 2 passed over Neptune's north pole, resulting in an acceleration out of the plane of the ecliptic and reduced its velocity away from the Sun.

Voyager did things no one predicted, found scenes no one expected, and promises to outlive its inventors. Like a great painting or an abiding institution, it has acquired an existence of its own, a destiny beyond the grasp of its handlers.

— Stephen J. Pyne

The two Voyager space probes were originally conceived as part of the Planetary Grand Tour planned during the late 1960s and early 70s that aimed to explore Jupiter, Saturn, Saturn's moon Titan, Uranus, Neptune, and Pluto. The mission originated from the Grand Tour program, conceptualized by Gary Flandro, an aerospace engineer at the Jet Propulsion Laboratory, in 1964, which leveraged a rare planetary alignment occurring once every 175 years. This alignment allowed a craft to reach all outer planets using gravitational assists. The mission was to send several pairs of probes and gained momentum in 1966 when it was endorsed by NASA's Jet Propulsion Laboratory. However, in December 1971, the Grand Tour mission was canceled when funding was redirected to the Space Shuttle program.

In 1972, a scaled-down (four planets, two identical spacecraft) mission was proposed, utilizing a spacecraft derived from the Mariner series, initially intended to be Mariner 11 and Mariner 12. The gravity-assist technique, successfully demonstrated by Mariner 10, would be used to achieve significant velocity changes by maneuvering through an intermediate planet's gravitational field to minimize time towards Saturn. The spacecraft were then moved into a separate program named Mariner Jupiter-Saturn (also Mariner Jupiter-Saturn-Uranus, MJS, or MJSU), part of the Mariner program, later renamed because it was thought that the design of the two space probes had progressed sufficiently beyond that of the Mariner family to merit a separate name.

=== Voyager probes ===
Interactive 3D model of the Voyager spacecraft .

On March 4, 1977, NASA announced a competition to rename the mission, believing the existing name was not appropriate as the mission had differed significantly from previous Mariner missions. Voyager was chosen as the new name, referencing an earlier suggestion by William Pickering, who had proposed the name Navigator. Due to the name change occurring close to launch, the probes were still occasionally referred to as Mariner 11 and Mariner 12, or even Voyager 11 and Voyager 12.

Two mission trajectories were established: JST aimed at Jupiter, Saturn, and enhancing a Titan flyby, while JSX served as a contingency plan. JST focused on a Titan flyby, while JSX provided a flexible mission plan. If JST succeeded, JSX could proceed with the Grand Tour, but in case of failure, JSX could be redirected for a separate Titan flyby, forfeiting the Grand Tour opportunity. The second probe, now Voyager 2, followed the JSX trajectory, granting it the option to continue on to Uranus and Neptune. Upon Voyager 1 completing its main objectives at Saturn, Voyager 2 received a mission extension, enabling it to proceed to Uranus and Neptune. This allowed Voyager 2 to diverge from the originally planned JST trajectory.

The probes would be launched in August or September 1977, with their main objective being to compare the characteristics of Jupiter and Saturn, such as their atmospheres, magnetic fields, particle environments, ring systems, and moons. They would fly by planets and moons in either a JST or JSX trajectory. After completing their flybys, the probes would communicate with Earth, relaying vital data using their magnetometers, spectrometers, and other instruments to detect interstellar, solar, and cosmic radiation. Their radioisotope thermoelectric generators (RTGs) would limit the maximum communication time with the probes to roughly a decade. Following their primary missions, the probes would continue to drift into interstellar space.

Voyager 2 was the first to be launched. Its trajectory was designed to allow flybys of Jupiter, Saturn, Uranus, and Neptune. Voyager 1 was launched after Voyager 2, but along a shorter and faster trajectory that was designed to provide an optimal flyby of Saturn's moon Titan, which was known to be quite large and to possess a dense atmosphere. This encounter sent Voyager 1 out of the plane of the ecliptic, ending its planetary science mission. Had Voyager 1 been unable to perform the Titan flyby, the trajectory of Voyager 2 could have been altered to explore Titan, forgoing any visit to Uranus and Neptune. Voyager 1 was not launched on a trajectory that would have allowed it to continue to Uranus and Neptune, but could have continued from Saturn to Pluto without exploring Titan.

During the 1990s, Voyager 1 overtook the slower deep-space probes Pioneer 10 and Pioneer 11 to become the most distant human-made object from Earth, a record that it will keep for the foreseeable future. The New Horizons probe, which had a higher launch velocity than Voyager 1, is travelling more slowly due to the extra speed Voyager 1 gained from its flyby of Saturn. Voyager 1 and Pioneer 10 are the most widely separated human-made objects anywhere since they are travelling in roughly opposite directions from the Solar System.

In December 2004, Voyager 1 crossed the termination shock, where the solar wind is slowed to subsonic speed, and entered the heliosheath, where the solar wind is compressed and made turbulent due to interactions with the interstellar medium. On 10 December 2007, Voyager 2 also reached the termination shock, about 1.6 billion kilometres (1 billion miles) closer to the Sun than from where Voyager 1 first crossed it, indicating that the Solar System is asymmetrical.

In 2010 Voyager 1 reported that the outward velocity of the solar wind had dropped to zero, and scientists predicted it was nearing interstellar space. In 2011, data from the Voyagers determined that the heliosheath was not smooth, but filled with giant magnetic bubbles. It was theorized that they formed when the magnetic field of the Sun became warped at the edge of the Solar System.

In June 2012, scientists at NASA reported that Voyager 1 was very close to entering interstellar space, which was indicated by a sharp rise in high-energy particles from outside the Solar System. In September 2013, NASA announced that Voyager 1 had crossed the heliopause on 25 August 2012, making it the first spacecraft to enter interstellar space.

In December 2018, NASA announced that Voyager 2 had crossed the heliopause on 5 November 2018, making it the second spacecraft to enter interstellar space.

As of 2017 Voyager 1 and Voyager 2 continued to monitor conditions in the outer expanses of the Solar System. The Voyager spacecraft were expected to be able to operate science instruments through 2020, when limited power would require instruments to be deactivated one by one. It was expected that circa 2025 there would no longer be sufficient power to operate any scientific instruments.

In July 2019, a revised power management plan was implemented for the two probes' dwindling power supplies.

On November 18, 2026, Voyager 1 became the first spacecraft to reach a distance of one light-day (about 25.9 billion kilometers, or 16.1 billion miles) from Earth.

== Spacecraft design ==
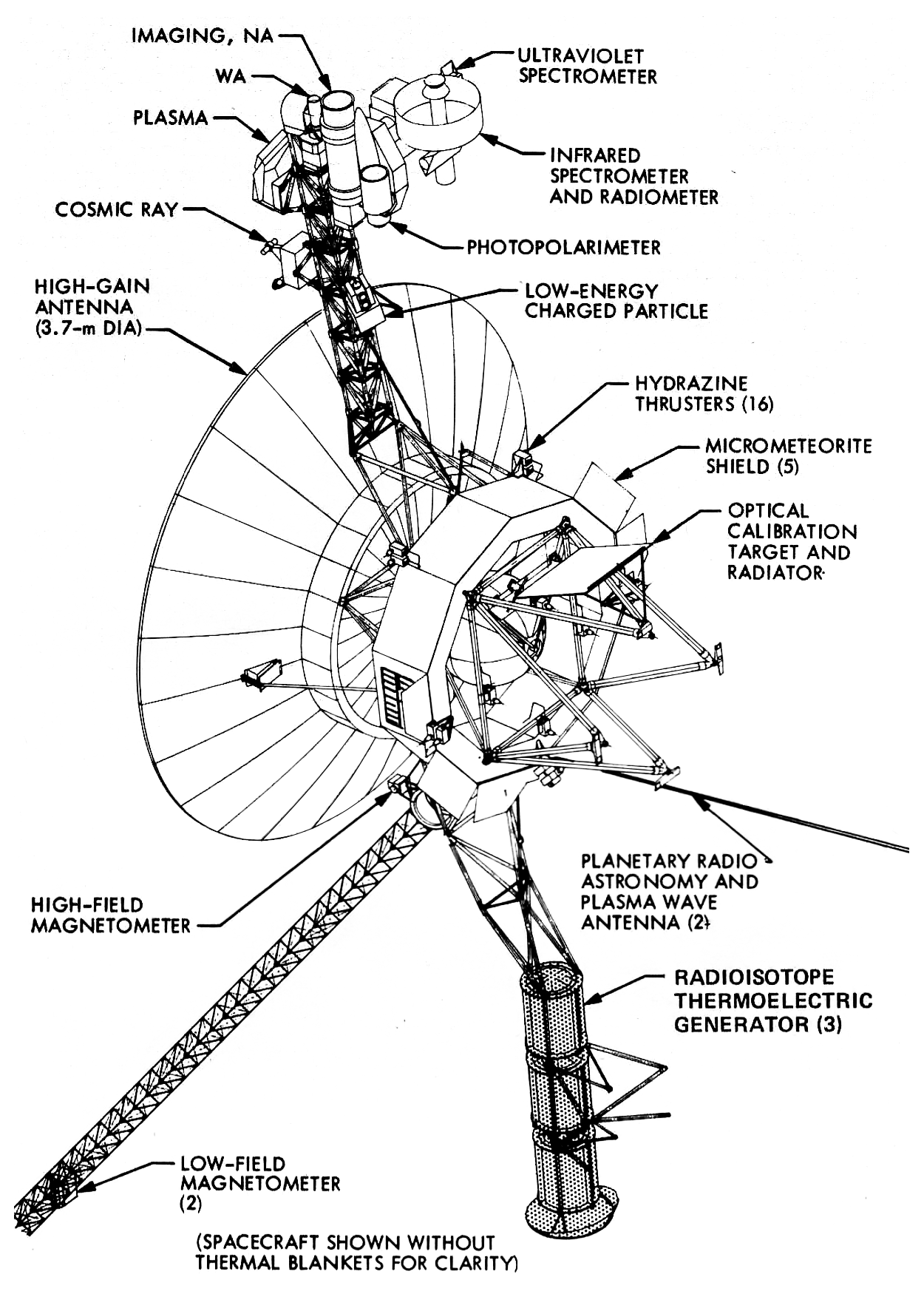
Voyager spacecraft diagram

The Voyager spacecraft each weighed 815 kilograms (1,797 pounds) at launch, but after fuel usage are now about 733 kilograms (1,616 pounds). Of this weight, each spacecraft carries 105 kilograms (231 pounds) of scientific instruments. The identical Voyager spacecraft use three-axis-stabilized guidance systems that use gyroscopic and accelerometer inputs to their attitude control computers to point their high-gain antennas towards the Earth and their scientific instruments towards their targets, sometimes with the help of a movable instrument platform for the smaller instruments and the electronic photography system.

The diagram shows the high-gain antenna (HGA) with a 3.7 m (12 ft) diameter dish attached to the hollow decagonal electronics container. There is also a spherical tank that contains the hydrazine monopropellant fuel.

The Voyager Golden Record is attached to one of the bus sides. The angled square panel to the right is the optical calibration target and excess heat radiator. The three radioisotope thermoelectric generators (RTGs) are mounted end-to-end on the lower boom.

The scan platform comprises: the Infrared Interferometer Spectrometer (IRIS) (largest camera at top right); the Ultraviolet Spectrometer (UVS) just above the IRIS; the two Imaging Science Subsystem (ISS) vidicon cameras to the left of the UVS; and the Photopolarimeter System (PPS) under the ISS.

Only five investigation teams are still supported, though data is collected for two additional instruments. The Flight Data Subsystem (FDS) and a single eight-track digital tape recorder (DTR) provide the data handling functions.

The FDS configures each instrument and controls instrument operations. It also collects engineering and science data and formats the data for transmission. The DTR is used to record high-rate Plasma Wave Subsystem (PWS) data, which is played back every six months.

The Imaging Science Subsystem made up of a wide-angle and a narrow-angle camera is a modified version of the slow scan vidicon camera designs that were used in the earlier Mariner flights. The Imaging Science Subsystem consists of two television-type cameras, each with eight filters in a commandable filter wheel mounted in front of the vidicons. One has a low resolution 200 mm (7.9 in) focal length wide-angle lens with an aperture of f/3 (the wide-angle camera), while the other uses a higher resolution 1,500 mm (59 in) narrow-angle f/8.5 lens (the narrow-angle camera).

Three spacecraft were built, Voyager 1 (VGR 77-1), Voyager 2 (VGR 77-3), and test spare model (VGR 77-2).

=== Scientific instruments ===
Structure of the Voyager spacecraft
Hover over a number or a list item to highlight that part. The spacecraft is shown without thermal blankets.
1High-gain antenna
A 3.7 m parabolic dish used to communicate with Earth through the NASA Deep Space Network.
2Bus
The ten-sided main body. It houses the electronics, the onboard computers and the digital tape recorder.
3Narrow-angle camera
Narrow-angle camera of the Imaging Science System (ISS), used for high-resolution images. Switched off in 1990.
4Wide-angle camera
Wide-angle camera of the Imaging Science System (ISS). Switched off in 1990.
5Plasma spectrometer
Measured the properties of plasma ions and electrons between 5 eV and 1 keV. Switched off in 2007 after its performance degraded.
6Cosmic Ray System
Studied the origin, acceleration and behaviour of interstellar cosmic rays. Switched off in 2025 to save power.
7Ultraviolet spectrometer
A spectrometer that measured atmospheric properties and radiation. Switched off in 2016.
8Infrared spectrometer and radiometer
Studied the energy balance, atmospheric composition and temperature profiles of planets and moons. Switched off in 1998.
9Photopolarimeter
A telescope with a polarizer, used to study the surfaces and atmospheres of Jupiter and Saturn. No longer working.
10Low-energy charged particle detector
Measured the energy fluxes of ions and electrons. Its data helped show that the probe had left the heliosphere. Switched off in 2026.
11Hydrazine thrusters (16)
Hydrazine thrusters used to control the spacecraft's attitude and keep the antenna pointed at Earth.
12Optical calibration target and radiator
A plate used to calibrate the cameras and optical instruments, and a radiator that sheds the spacecraft's heat.
13High-field magnetometers (2)
Magnetometers near the bus that measured the strong magnetic fields of the planets.
14Low-field magnetometers (2)
Mounted at the middle and the tip of the 13 m boom, away from the spacecraft's own magnetic field. They measure the weak interplanetary and interstellar fields. Still operating.
15Planetary radio astronomy and plasma wave antennas (2)
Two 10 m antennas shared by the Planetary Radio Astronomy experiment (switched off in 2008) and the Plasma Wave Subsystem (still operating).
16Radioisotope thermoelectric generators (3)
The spacecraft's power source: they turn the heat from the decay of plutonium-238 into electricity. They produced about 470 W at launch.
1
High-gain antenna
A 3.7 m parabolic dish used to communicate with Earth through the NASA Deep Space Network.
2
Bus
The ten-sided main body. It houses the electronics, the onboard computers and the digital tape recorder.
3
Narrow-angle camera
Narrow-angle camera of the Imaging Science System (ISS), used for high-resolution images. Switched off in 1990.
4
Wide-angle camera
Wide-angle camera of the Imaging Science System (ISS). Switched off in 1990.
5
Plasma spectrometer
Measured the properties of plasma ions and electrons between 5 eV and 1 keV. Switched off in 2007 after its performance degraded.
6
Cosmic Ray System
Studied the origin, acceleration and behaviour of interstellar cosmic rays. Switched off in 2025 to save power.
7
Ultraviolet spectrometer
A spectrometer that measured atmospheric properties and radiation. Switched off in 2016.
8
Infrared spectrometer and radiometer
Studied the energy balance, atmospheric composition and temperature profiles of planets and moons. Switched off in 1998.
9
Photopolarimeter
A telescope with a polarizer, used to study the surfaces and atmospheres of Jupiter and Saturn. No longer working.
10
Low-energy charged particle detector
Measured the energy fluxes of ions and electrons. Its data helped show that the probe had left the heliosphere. Switched off in 2026.
11
Hydrazine thrusters (16)
Hydrazine thrusters used to control the spacecraft's attitude and keep the antenna pointed at Earth.
12
Optical calibration target and radiator
A plate used to calibrate the cameras and optical instruments, and a radiator that sheds the spacecraft's heat.
13
High-field magnetometers (2)
Magnetometers near the bus that measured the strong magnetic fields of the planets.
14
Low-field magnetometers (2)
Mounted at the middle and the tip of the 13 m boom, away from the spacecraft's own magnetic field. They measure the weak interplanetary and interstellar fields. Still operating.
15
Planetary radio astronomy and plasma wave antennas (2)
Two 10 m antennas shared by the Planetary Radio Astronomy experiment (switched off in 2008) and the Plasma Wave Subsystem (still operating).
16
Radioisotope thermoelectric generators (3)
The spacecraft's power source: they turn the heat from the decay of plutonium-238 into electricity. They produced about 470 W at launch.
Image credits

List of scientific instruments
Instrument name	Abbreviation	Description
Imaging Science System	ISS	Used a two-camera system (narrow-angle/wide-angle) to provide imagery of Jupiter, Saturn and other objects along the trajectory. Filters Narrow-angle camera: Name / Wavelength / Spectrum / Sensitivity; 0 – Clear / 280–640 nm; 4 – Clear / 280–640 nm; 7 – UV / 280–370 nm; 1 – Violet / 350–450 nm; 2 – Blue / 430–530 nm; 5 – Green / 530–640 nm; 6 – Green / 530–640 nm; 3 – Orange / 590–640 nm; Wide-angle camera: Name / Wavelength / Spectrum / Sensitivity; 2 – Clear / 280–640 nm; 3 – Violet / 350–450 nm; 1 – Blue / 430–530 nm; 6 – CH_{4}-U / 536–546 nm; 5 – Green / 530–640 nm; 4 – Na-D / 588–590 nm; 7 – Orange / 590–640 nm; 0 – CH_{4}-JST / 614–624 nm; Principal investigator: Bradford A. Smith / University of Arizona; Data: PDS/PDI data catalog, PDS/PRN data catalog
Radio Science System	RSS	Used the telecommunications system of the Voyager spacecraft to determine the physical properties of planets and satellites (ionospheres, atmospheres, masses, gravity fields, densities) and the amount and size distribution of material in the Saturn rings and the ring dimensions.: Principal investigator: Von R. Eshleman; Data: PDS/PPI data catalog, PDS/PRN data catalog (VG_2803), NSSDC data archive
Infrared interferometer spectrometer and radiometer	IRIS	Investigated both global and local energy balance and atmospheric composition. Vertical temperature profiles were also obtained from the planets and satellites, as well as the composition, thermal properties, and size of particles in Saturn's rings.: Principal investigator: Rudolf Hanel / NASA Goddard Space Flight Center; Data: PDS/PRN data catalog, PDS/PRN expanded data catalog (VGIRIS_0001, VGIRIS_002), NSSDC Jupiter data archive
Ultraviolet Spectrometer	UVS	Designed to measure atmospheric properties, and to measure radiation.: Principal investigator: A. Lyle Broadfoot / University of Southern California; Data: PDS/PRN data catalog
Triaxial Fluxgate Magnetometer	MAG	Designed to investigate the magnetic fields of Jupiter and Saturn, the solar-wind interaction with the magnetospheres of these planets, and the interplanetary magnetic field out to the solar wind boundary with the interstellar magnetic field and beyond, if crossed.: Principal investigator: Norman F. Ness / NASA Goddard Space Flight Center; Data: PDS/PPI data catalog, NSSDC data archive
Plasma Spectrometer	PLS	Investigated the macroscopic properties of the plasma ions and measures electrons in the energy range from 5 eV to 1 keV.: Principal investigator: Herbert S. Bridge / MIT; Data: PDS/PPI data catalog, NSSDC data archive
Low Energy Charged Particle Instrument	LECP	Measures the differential in energy fluxes and angular distributions of ions, electrons and the differential in energy ion composition.: Principal investigator: Stamatios Krimigis / JHU/APL / University of Maryland; Data: UMD data plotting, PDS/PPI data catalog, NSSDC data archive
Cosmic Ray System	CRS	Determines the origin and acceleration process, life history, and dynamic contribution of interstellar cosmic rays, the nucleosynthesis of elements in cosmic-ray sources, the behavior of cosmic rays in the interplanetary medium, and the trapped planetary energetic-particle environment.: Principal investigator: Rochus Eugen Vogt, Edward C. Stone, Alan C. Cummings / Caltech / NASA Goddard Space Flight Center; Data: PDS/PPI data catalog, NSSDC data archive
Planetary Radio Astronomy Investigation	PRA	Used a sweep-frequency radio receiver to study the radio-emission signals from Jupiter and Saturn.: Principal investigator: James W. Warwick / University of Colorado; Data: PDS/PPI data catalog, NSSDC data archive
Photopolarimeter System	PPS	Used a 6-inch f/1.4 Dahl-Kirkham-type Cassegrain telescope with an analyzer wheel containing five analyzers of 0,60,120,45 and 135 degrees and filter wheel with eight spectral bands covering 2350 to 7500A to gather information on surface texture and composition of Jupiter, Saturn, Uranus and Neptune and information on atmospheric scattering properties and density for these planets.: Principal investigator: Charles F. Lillie, Charles W. Hord; Data: PDS/PRN data catalog and PDS Atmospheric Node
Plasma Wave Subsystem	PWS	Provides continuous, sheath-independent measurements of the electron-density profiles at Jupiter and Saturn as well as basic information on local wave-particle interaction, useful in studying the magnetospheres.: Principal investigator: Frederick L. Scarf / TRW, Donald Gurnett / University of Iowa; Data: PDS/PPI data catalog

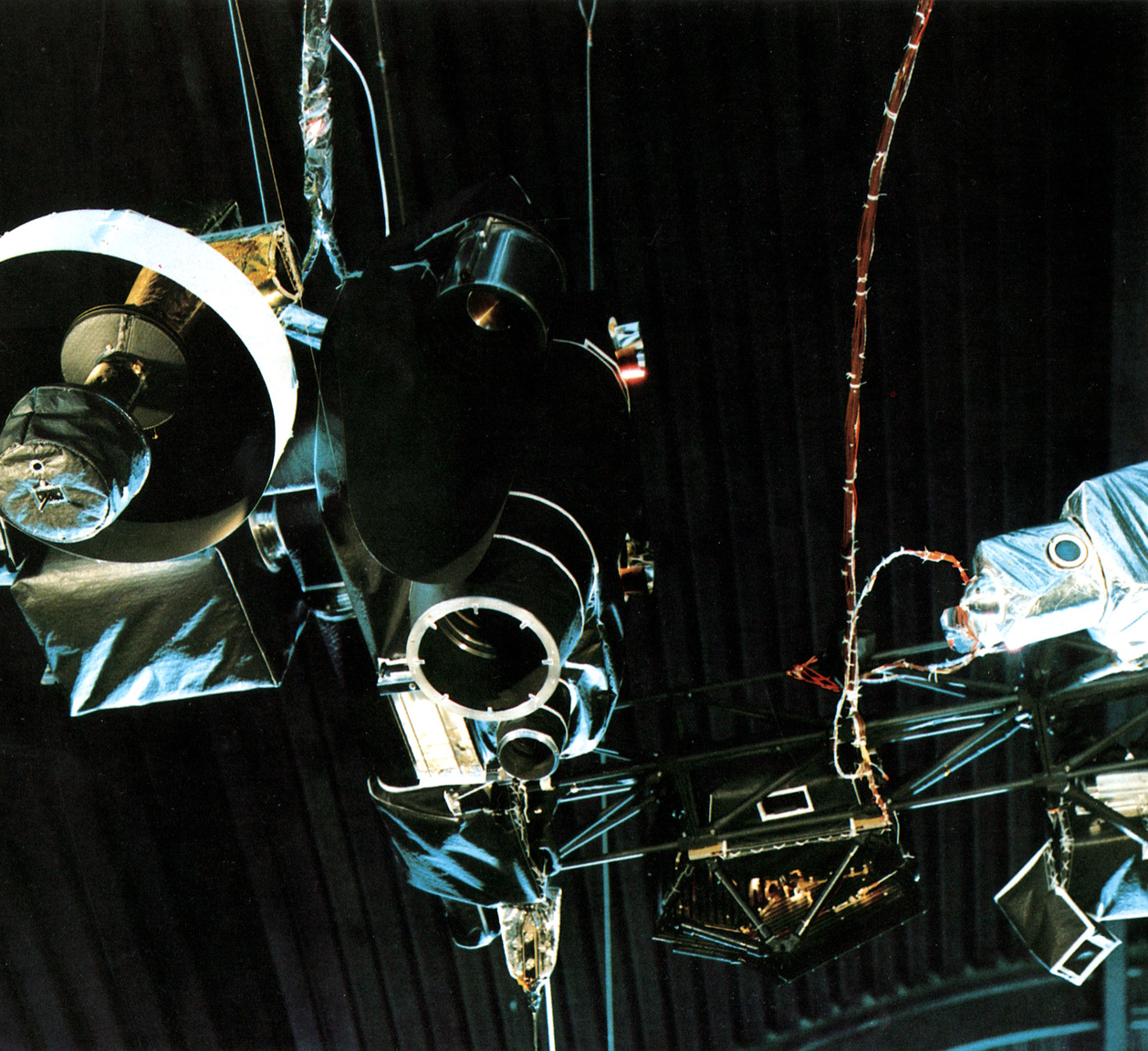
A view of some of Voyager's instruments from below. Left: the cameras, ultraviolet and infrared spectrometers (far left), plasma detector (black box lower right), particle and radiation detectors (far right). On the boom, center and right, are plasma, particle, and cosmic ray detectors.

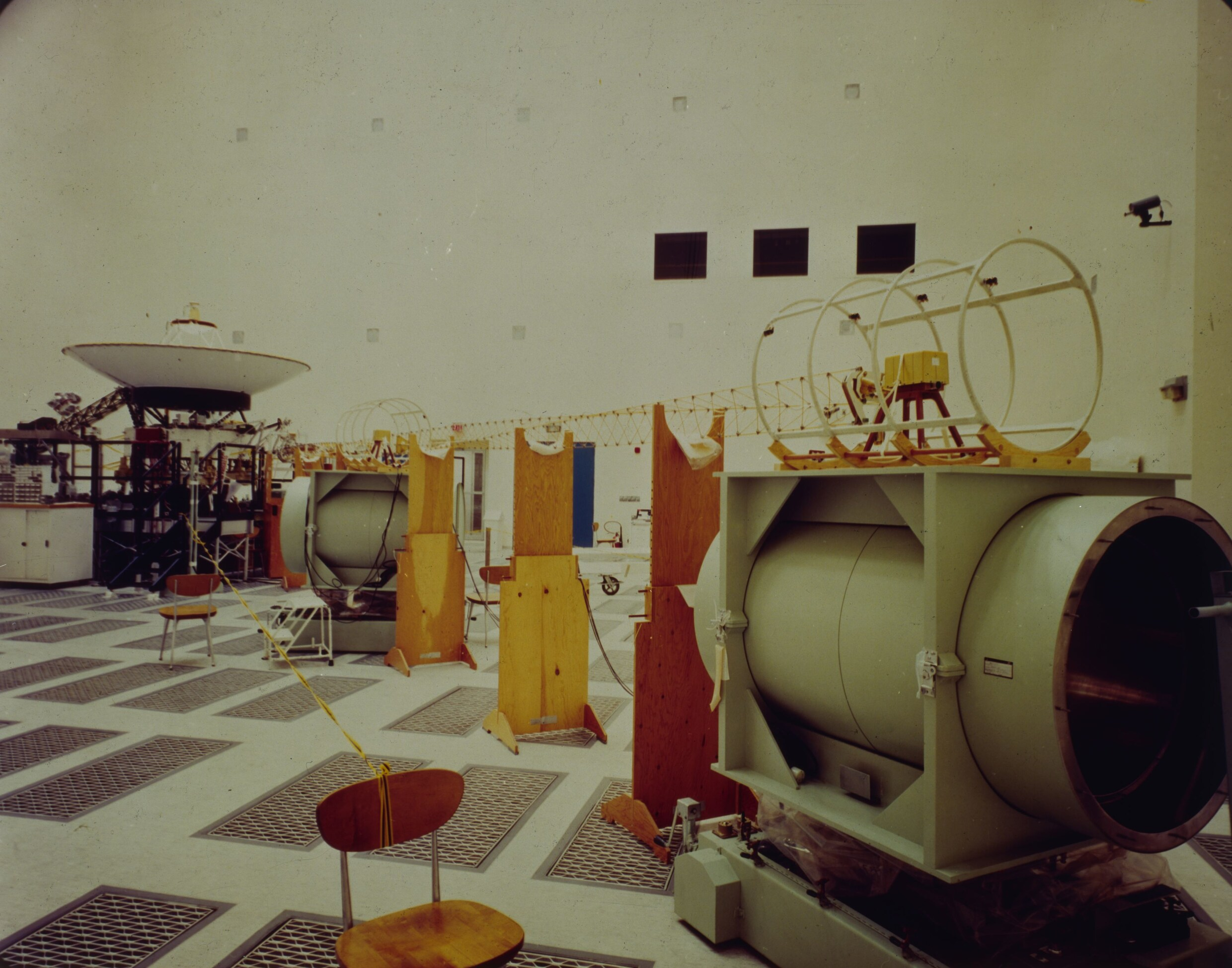
Voyager's fully extended 13-meter-long magnetometer boom

=== Computers and data processing ===
There are three different computer types on the Voyager spacecraft, two of each kind, sometimes used for redundancy. They are proprietary, custom-built computers built from CMOS and TTL medium-scale integrated circuits and discrete components, mostly from the 7400 series of Texas Instruments. The total number of words among the six computers is about 32K. Voyager 1 and Voyager 2 have identical computer systems.

The Computer Command System (CCS), the central controller of the spacecraft, has two 18-bit word, interrupt-type processors with 4096 words each of non-volatile plated-wire memory. During most of the Voyager mission the two CCS computers on each spacecraft were used non-redundantly to increase the command and processing capability of the spacecraft. The CCS is nearly identical to the system flown on the Viking spacecraft.

The Flight Data System (FDS) is two 16-bit word machines with modular memories and 8198 words each.

The Attitude and Articulation Control System (AACS) is two 18-bit word machines with 4096 words each.

Unlike the other on-board instruments, the operation of the cameras for visible light is not autonomous, but rather it is controlled by an imaging parameter table contained in one of the on-board digital computers, the Flight Data Subsystem (FDS). More recent space probes, since about 1990, usually have completely autonomous cameras.

The computer command subsystem (CCS) controls the cameras. The CCS contains fixed computer programs such as command decoding, fault detection, and correction routines, antenna-pointing routines, and spacecraft sequencing routines. This computer is an improved version of the one that was used in the Viking orbiter. The hardware in both custom-built CCS subsystems in the Voyagers is identical. There is only a minor software modification for one of them that has a scientific subsystem that the other lacks.

According to Guinness Book of Records, CCS holds record of "longest period of continual operation for a computer". It has been running continuously since 20 August 1977.

The Attitude and Articulation Control Subsystem (AACS) controls the spacecraft orientation (its attitude). It keeps the high-gain antenna pointing towards the Earth, controls attitude changes, and points the scan platform. The custom-built AACS systems on both craft are identical.

It has been erroneously reported on the Internet that the Voyager space probes were controlled by a version of the RCA 1802 (RCA CDP1802 "COSMAC" microprocessor), but such claims are not supported by the primary design documents. The CDP1802 microprocessor was used later in the Galileo space probe, which was designed and built years later. The digital control electronics of the Voyagers were not based on a microprocessor integrated-circuit chip.

=== Communications ===
The uplink communications are executed via S-band microwave communications. The downlink communications are carried out by an X-band microwave transmitter on board the spacecraft, with an S-band transmitter as a back-up. All long-range communications to and from the two Voyagers have been carried out using their 3.7-meter (12 ft) high-gain antennas. The high-gain antenna has a beamwidth of 0.5° for X-band, and 2.3° for S-band. (The low-gain antenna has a 7 dB gain and 60° beamwidth.)

Because of the inverse-square law in radio communications, the digital data rates used in the downlinks from the Voyagers have been continually decreasing the farther that they get from the Earth. For example, the data rate used from Jupiter was about 115,000 bits per second. That was halved at the distance of Saturn, and it has gone down continually since then. Some measures were taken on the ground along the way to reduce the effects of the inverse-square law. In between 1982 and 1985, the diameters of the three main parabolic dish antennas of the Deep Space Network were increased from 64 to 70 m (210 to 230 ft) dramatically increasing their areas for gathering weak microwave signals.

Whilst the craft were between Saturn and Uranus the onboard software was upgraded to do a degree of image compression and to use a more efficient Reed-Solomon error-correcting encoding.

Then between 1986 and 1989, new techniques were brought into play to combine the signals from multiple antennas on the ground into one, more powerful signal, in a kind of an antenna array. This was done at Goldstone, California, Canberra (Australia), and Madrid (Spain) using the additional dish antennas available there. Also, in Australia, the Parkes Radio Telescope was brought into the array in time for the fly-by of Neptune in 1989. In the United States, the Very Large Array in New Mexico was brought into temporary use along with the antennas of the Deep Space Network at Goldstone. Using this new technology of antenna arrays helped to compensate for the immense radio distance from Neptune to the Earth.

=== Power ===
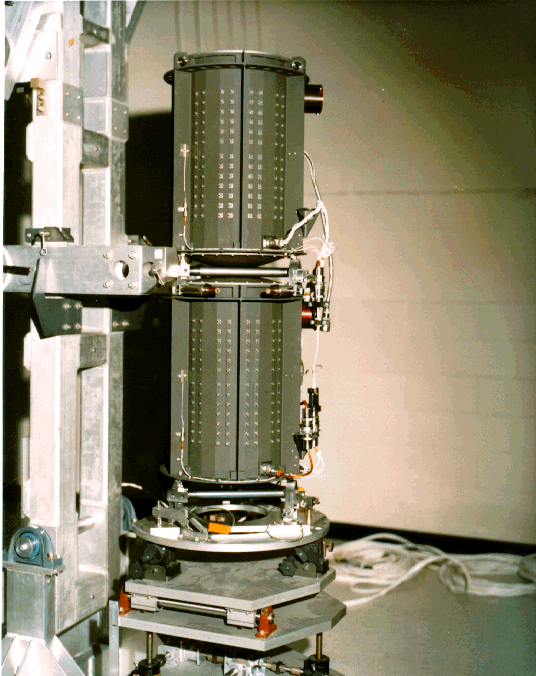
RTGs for the Voyager program

Electrical power is supplied by three MHW-RTG radioisotope thermoelectric generators (RTGs). They are powered by plutonium-238 (distinct from the Pu-239 isotope used in nuclear weapons) and provided approximately 470 W at 30 volts DC when the spacecraft was launched. Plutonium-238 decays with a half-life of 87.74 years, so RTGs using Pu-238 will lose a factor of 1−0.5^{(1/87.74)} = 0.79% of their power output per year.

In 2011, 34 years after launch, the thermal power generated by such an RTG would be reduced to (1/2)^{(34/87.74)} ≈ 76% of its initial power. The RTG thermocouples, which convert thermal power into electricity, also degrade over time reducing available electric power below this calculated level.

By 7 October 2011 the power generated by Voyager 1 and Voyager 2 had dropped to 267.9 W and 269.2 W respectively, about 57% of the power at launch. The level of power output was better than pre-launch predictions based on a conservative thermocouple degradation model. As the electrical power decreases, spacecraft loads must be turned off, eliminating some capabilities. There may be insufficient power for communications by 2032.

== Voyager Interstellar Mission ==
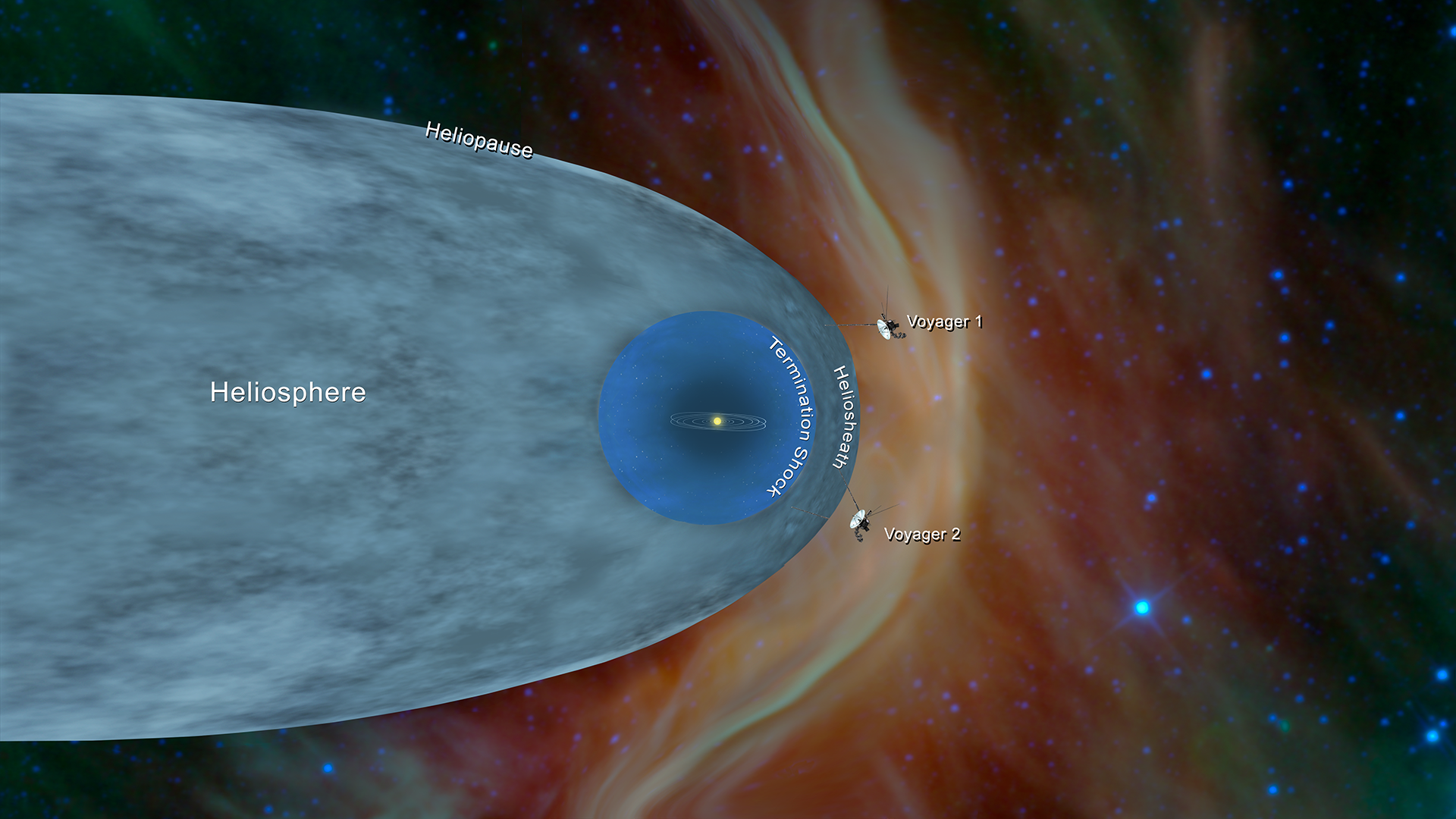
Voyager 1 crossed the heliopause, or the edge of the heliosphere, in August 2012. Voyager 2 crossed the heliosheath in November 2018.

The Voyager primary mission was completed in 1989, with the close flyby of Neptune by Voyager 2. The Voyager Interstellar Mission (VIM) is a mission extension, which began when the two spacecraft had already been in flight for over 12 years. The Heliophysics Division of the NASA Science Mission Directorate conducted a Heliophysics Senior Review in 2008. The panel found that the VIM "is a mission that is absolutely imperative to continue" and that VIM "funding near the optimal level and increased DSN (Deep Space Network) support is warranted."

The main objective of the VIM was to extend the exploration of the Solar System beyond the outer planets to the heliopause (the farthest extent at which the Sun's radiation predominates over interstellar winds) and if possible even beyond. Voyager 1 crossed the heliopause boundary in 2012, followed by Voyager 2 in 2018. Passing through the heliopause boundary has allowed both spacecraft to make measurements of the interstellar fields, particles and waves unaffected by the solar wind. Two significant findings so far have been the discovery of a region of magnetic bubbles and no indication of an expected shift in the Solar magnetic field.

The entire Voyager 2 scan platform, including all of the platform instruments, was switched off in 1998. All platform instruments on Voyager 1, except for the ultraviolet spectrometer (UVS) have also been switched off.

The Voyager 1 scan platform was scheduled to go off-line in late 2000 but has been left on to investigate UV emission from the upwind direction. UVS data are still captured but scans are no longer possible.

Gyro operations ended in 2016 for Voyager 2 and in 2017 for Voyager 1. Gyro operations are used to rotate the probe 360 degrees six times per year to measure the magnetic field of the spacecraft, which is then subtracted from the magnetometer science data.

On 14 November 2023, Voyager 1 stopped sending all telemetry and data, though the signal was still present. After months of experiments, made considerably more difficult by the 45 hour round trip time, the cause was traced to a bad memory chip. New software was written to avoid the bad memory block, and engineering data resumed on 20 April 2024. Science data from two instruments resumed in May 2024, and full recovery (of all science instruments that were still powered up) was in June 2024. For more details of this intricate operation, see Voyager 1.

The two spacecraft continue to operate, with some loss in subsystem redundancy but retain the capability to return scientific data from a full complement of Voyager Interstellar Mission (VIM) science instruments.

Both spacecraft also have adequate electrical power and attitude control propellant to continue operating and collecting science data through at least 2026. Though additional science instruments may need to be turned off, the spacecraft are expected to be able to communicate until 2036, in the absence of additional failures.

=== Mission details ===
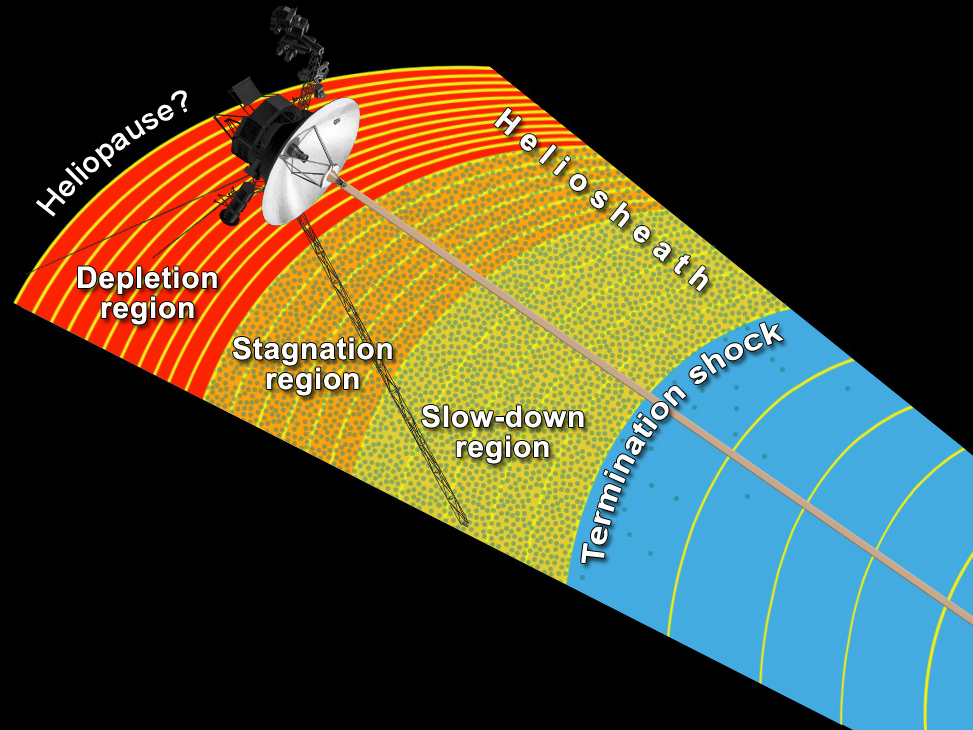
This diagram about the heliosphere was released on 28 June 2013 and incorporates results from the Voyager spacecraft.

By the start of VIM, Voyager 1 was at a distance of 40 AU from the Earth, while Voyager 2 was at 31 AU. VIM is in three phases: termination shock, heliosheath exploration, and interstellar exploration phase. The spacecraft began VIM in an environment controlled by the Sun's magnetic field, with the plasma particles being dominated by those contained in the expanding supersonic solar wind. This is the characteristic environment of the termination shock phase. At some distance from the Sun, the supersonic solar wind will be held back from further expansion by the interstellar wind. The first feature encountered by a spacecraft as a result of this interaction – between interstellar wind and solar wind – was the termination shock, where the solar wind slows to subsonic speed, and large changes in plasma flow direction and magnetic field orientation occur. Voyager 1 completed the phase of termination shock in December 2004 at a distance of 94 AU, while Voyager 2 completed it in August 2007 at a distance of 84 AU. After entering into the heliosheath, the spacecraft were in an area that is dominated by the Sun's magnetic field and solar wind particles. After passing through the heliosheath, the two Voyagers began the phase of interstellar exploration. The outer boundary of the heliosheath is called the heliopause. This is the region where the Sun's influence begins to decrease and interstellar space can be detected.

Voyager 1 is escaping the Solar System at the speed of 3.6 AU per year 35° north of the ecliptic in the general direction of the solar apex in Hercules, while Voyager 2's speed is about 3.3 AU per year, heading 48° south of the ecliptic. The Voyager spacecraft will eventually go on to the stars. In about 40,000 years, Voyager 1 will be within 1.6 light years (ly) of AC+79 3888, also known as Gliese 445, which is approaching the Sun. In 40,000 years Voyager 2 will be within 1.7 ly of Ross 248 (another star which is approaching the Sun), and in 296,000 years it will pass within 4.6 ly of Sirius, which is the brightest star in the night-sky. The spacecraft are not expected to collide with a star for 1 sextillion (10^{20}) years.

In October 2020, astronomers reported a significant unexpected increase in density in the space beyond the Solar System, as detected by the Voyager space probes. According to the researchers, this implies that "the density gradient is a large-scale feature of the VLISM (very local interstellar medium) in the general direction of the heliospheric nose".

== Voyager Golden Record ==
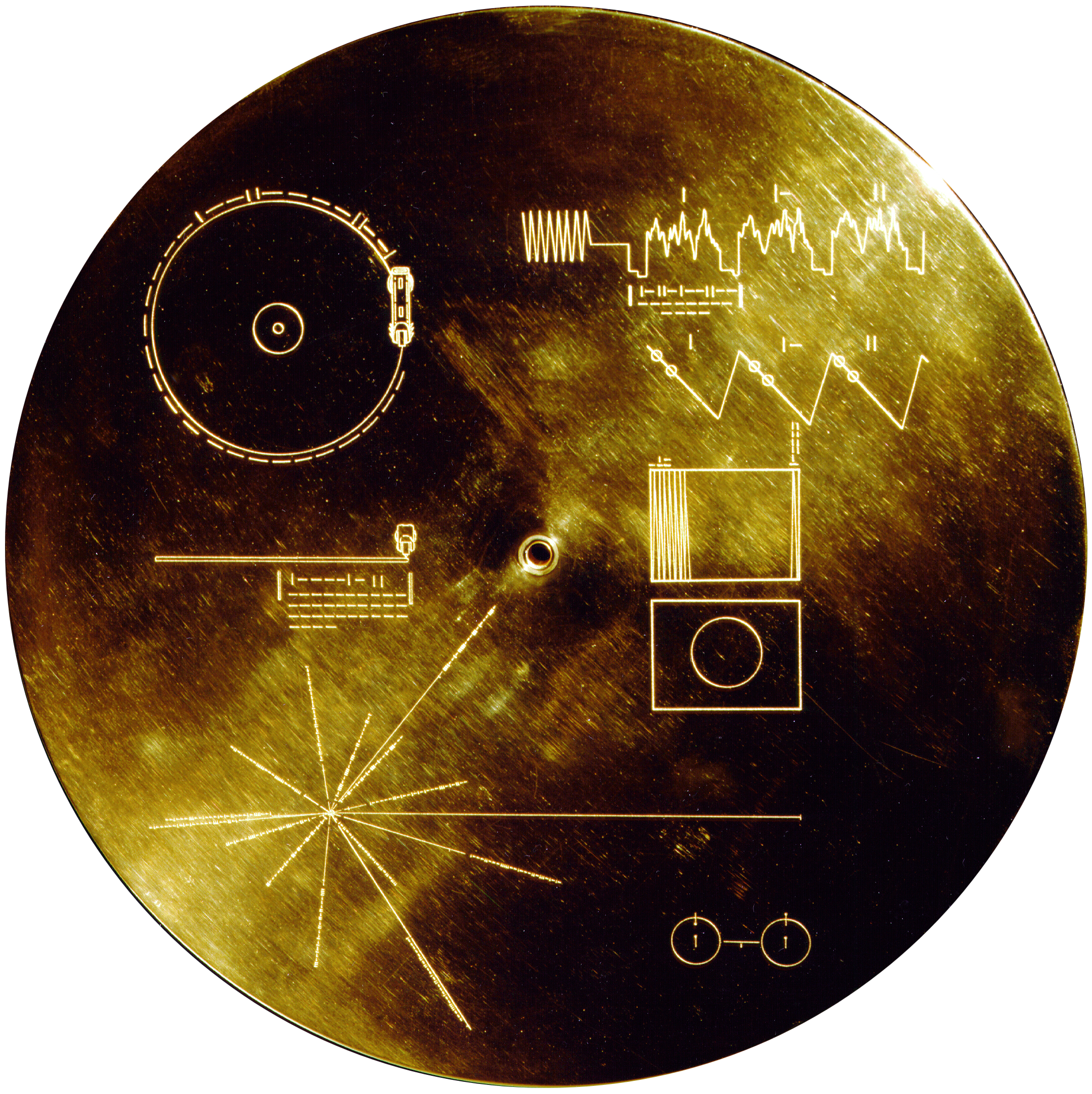
The cover of the Voyager Golden Record

Both spacecraft carry a 12-inch (30 cm) golden phonograph record that contains pictures and sounds of Earth, symbolic directions on the cover for playing the record, and data detailing the location of Earth. The record is intended as a combination time capsule and an interstellar message to any civilization, alien or far-future human, that may recover either of the Voyagers. The contents of this record were selected by a committee that included Timothy Ferris and was chaired by Carl Sagan.

== Pale Blue Dot ==
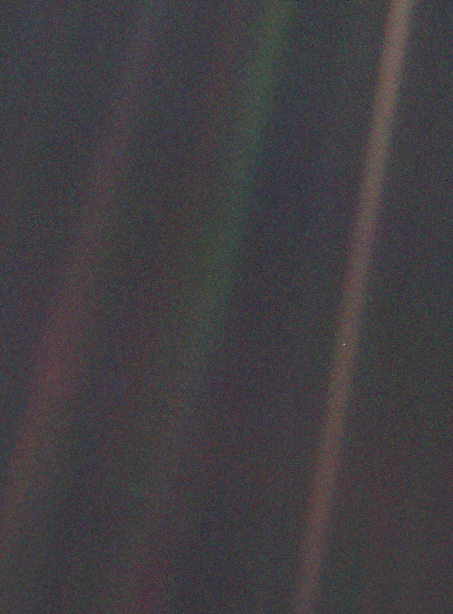
Seen from 6 billion kilometers (3.7 billion miles), Earth appears as a Pale Blue Dot (the blueish-white speck approximately halfway down the light band to the right).

Pale Blue Dot is a photograph of Earth taken on February 14, 1990, by the Voyager 1 space probe from a distance of approximately 6 billion kilometers (3.7 billion miles, 40.5 AU), as part of that day's Family Portrait series of images of the Solar System. The Voyager program's discoveries during the primary phase of its mission, including new close-up color photos of the major planets, were regularly documented by print and electronic media outlets. Among the best-known of these is an image of the Earth as a Pale Blue Dot, taken in 1990 by Voyager 1, and popularized by Carl Sagan,

Consider again that dot. That's here. That's home. That's us....The Earth is a very small stage in a vast cosmic arena.... To my mind, there is perhaps no better demonstration of the folly of human conceits than this distant image of our tiny world. To me, it underscores our responsibility to deal more kindly and compassionately with one another and to preserve and cherish that pale blue dot, the only home we've ever known.

== See also ==
- Family Portrait
- The Farthest, a 2017 documentary on the program.
- Interstellar Express, a pair of Chinese probes inspired in part by the Voyagers.
- Interstellar probe
- Pioneer program
- Planetary Grand Tour
- Timeline of Solar System exploration
