= Priti Shankar =

Indian professor and researcher

Priti Shankar (née Priti Monteiro; September 1947 – October 2011) was an Indian teacher, researcher, and educationist whose research focused on the areas of compiler design, formal language theory and algorithmic coding theory.

== Early life and career ==
Priti Shankar was born in a Goan family. Her father, Innocencio Monteiro, was a Brigadier in the Indian Army while her mother, Sophia, was a mathematics and French teacher.

In 1958 her parents moved from Khadakwasla, Pune to Jammu where her father served along India-Pakistan border in Surankote. As a result of the move Priti had skipped six months of school and therefore was coached at home by her mother. A few years later, she returned to Pune and enrolled into Fergusson College. She later attended Indian Institute of Technology in Delhi from which she was the first female to be graduated with a Bachelor of Technology degree in electrical engineering in 1968. Following the graduation she applied to the University of Maryland, College Park from which in 1972 she received her Ph.D. A year later she returned to India and was appointed as an assistant professor at the Centre for Automation at the Indian Institute of Science (IISc), Bangalore and worked there till retirement.

In 1979 Priti had pioneered the science field by developing a BCH code which were defined over finite fields and therefore became operational over finite rings. In 2002 she was a co-editor of CRC Press, along with Y. N. Srikant and also served on leadership board of the Resonance, a peer reviewed journal of India.

== Personal life ==
Priti had numerous siblings, including Sunitha Noronha; Vivek Monteiro, a theoretical physicist; Anjali Monteiro, a filmmaker and professor of media studies; and Nandita de Souza a developmental and behavioural pediatrician. In 1974 she married P. N. Shankar, a theoretical fluid dynamicist at the National Aerospace Laboratories of Bangalore. In 1976 she gave a birth to a son named Nachiket and in 1983 Mridula, a daughter, was born.

== Honours ==
In 2007, Shankar received the Jaya Jayant award for teaching excellence and between 2006 and 2009 she was named a Distinguished Lecturer by the Institute of Electrical and Electronics Engineers.

== Legacy ==
The Priti Shankar Library of Popular Math and Science is housed in the UMED building of the Navnirmiti Learning Foundation.
