= P. N. Shankar =

Indian scientist (1944–2019)

- Born: 13 August 1944; Bombay, India
- Died: 15 April 2019 (aged 74)
- Citizenship: Indian
- Education: Imperial College; California Institute of Technology
- Scientific career
- Fields: Fluid Mechanics
- Workplaces: University of Maryland; National Aerospace Laboratories
- Thesis: I. The effect of droplet solidification upon two-phase flow in a rocket nozzle. II. A kinetic theory investigation of some condensation-evaporation phenomena by a moment method (1968)
- Doctoral advisor: Frank E. Marble

Pattamadai Narasimhan Shankar was an Indian scientist who worked in the field of fluid dynamics. He was married to Priti Shankar.

== Education ==
He did his schooling in India and Switzerland, while obtaining his bachelor's degree in Mechanical Engineering in 1964 from Imperial College London. He completed his PhD degree in engineering science from California Institute of Technology under the supervision of Frank E. Marble in 1968.

== Career and research ==
He worked at General Electric for two years before becoming an assistant professor at University of Maryland for the period 1970-72. In 1972, he moved to National Aerospace Laboratories and stayed there until his retirement in 2004.

== Publications ==
Shankar is the author of several journal articles, mostly appeared in the Journal of Fluid Mechanics and Proceedings of the Royal Society. He is the author of the book:

- P. N. Shankar (2007). Slow Viscous Flows: Qualitative Features and Quantitative Analysis Using Complex Eigenfunction Expansions. Imperial College Press. ISBN 978-1860947810.
- P. N. Shankar. How to make a telescope?.

== Honors ==
He was the 1971 recipient of Robert T. Knapp Award given by ASME. He was elected as fellow in Indian Academy of Sciences in 1992.
