= Susan Wu =

Engineer and business woman (1932–2020)

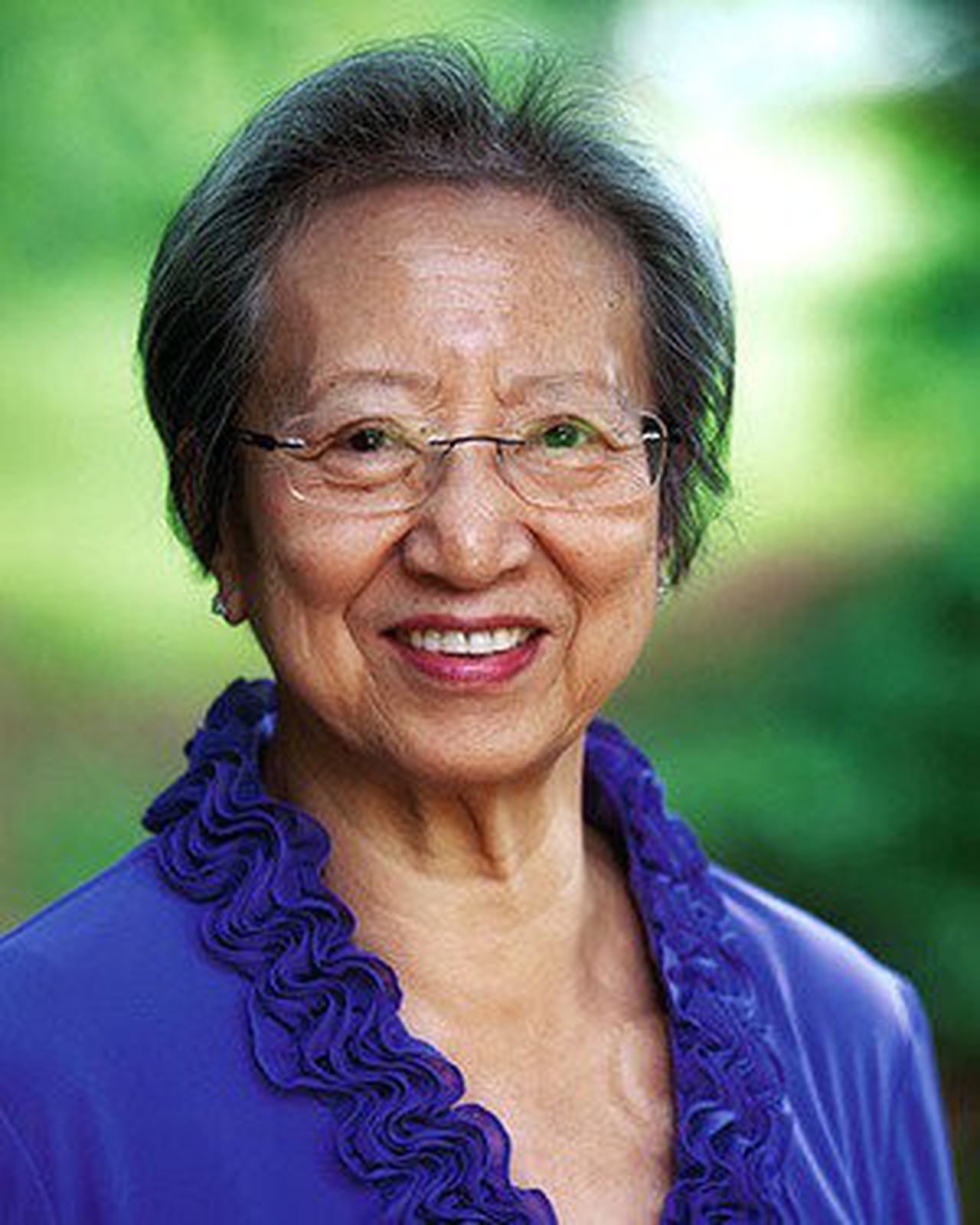
- Born: Ying Chu Lin Wu; June 26, 1932; Beijing, China
- Died: May 19, 2020 (aged 87)
- Other name: Y.C.L. Susan Wu
- Education: Mechanical Engineering in National Taiwan University (1951), Aeronautics (PHD) California Institute of Technology (1963)
- Occupations: President and CEO of ERC, Chairman of Information Technology Subcommittee, Professor in University of Tennessee Space Institute in Tullahoma, Presidential Appointee on National Air and Space Museum Advisory Board
- Scientific career
- Thesis: Flow Generated by Suddenly Heated Flat Plate (1963)

Ying Chu Lin (Susan) Wu (July 26, 1932 - May 19, 2020) was a Chinese-born American businesswoman and engineer in magnetohydrodynamics, aeronautics, and aerospace engineering.

== Education and career ==
Wu was born in Peking, China studied mechanical engineering at National Taiwan University, and earned a B.S. in 1955. She moved to the United States in 1957 and earned an M.S. from Ohio State University in 1959 before moving to the California Institute of Technology (Caltech), where she became the first woman to earn a Ph.D. in aeronautics in 1963. Wu worked at Electro-Optics Corporation for two years. In 1965 she joined the faculty at the University of Tennessee Space Institute where she was promoted to professor in 1973. In 1988, she founded ERC, Engineering Research and Consulting, a company in the defense and space industries, which is now Astrion.

Wu's research centered on magnetohydrodynamic generators. She served on the National Air and Space Museum Advisory Board from 1993 to 2000 and spoke to the United States House of Representatives about magnetohydrodynamic generators.

== Awards and honors ==
Wu received an Amelia Earhart fellowship from Zonta International in 1960 while working on her Ph.D. degree. In 1985 she received the Society of Women Engineers Achievement Award. In 1996, Wu was recognized by the American Institute of Aeronautics and Astronautics, where she was an associate fellow, for her work which led to space weather prediction. In 2013 Wu received a distinguished alumni award from Caltech.

== Selected publications ==
- Wu, Y. C. L. (1976-10-01). "Performance theory of diagonal conducting wall MHD generators". AIAA Journal. 14 (10): 1362–1368. Bibcode:1976AIAAJ..14.1362W. doi:10.2514/3.7227. ISSN 0001-1452.
- Wu, Y. C. L.; Dicks, J. B.; Denzel, D. L.; Witkowski, S.; Shanklin, R. V.; Zitzow, U.; Chang, P.; Jett, E. S. (1968). "MHD generator in two-terminal operation". AIAA Journal. 6 (9): 1651–1657. Bibcode:1968AIAAJ...6.1651D. doi:10.2514/3.4841. ISSN 0001-1452.
- Wu, Y. C. L. (1976). "Performance theory of diagonal conducting wall MHD generators". AIAA Journal. 14 (10): 1362–1368. Bibcode:1976AIAAJ..14.1362W. doi:10.2514/3.7227. ISSN 0001-1452.
- Lineberry, J. T.; Galanga, F. L.; Liu, B. L.; Wu, Y. C. L.; Scott, M. H.; Pan, Y. C.; Doss, E. D. (1982). "Comparison of Experimental Results from the UTSI Coal-Fired MHD Generator to Theoretical Predictions". Journal of Energy. 6 (3): 187–195. doi:10.2514/3.62589. ISSN 0146-0412.
- Attig, R. C.; Chapman, J. N.; Sheth, A. C.; Wu, Y. C. L. S. (1988-11-01). "Emission control by magnetohydrodynamics". CHEMTECH; (United States). 18 (11).
