= Frank E. Marble =

American scientist

- Born: July 21, 1918; Cleveland, Ohio
- Died: August 11, 2014 (aged 96)
- Citizenship: American
- Education: Case Institute of Technology; California Institute of Technology
- Known for: Marble–Adamson problem
- Scientific career
- Fields: Aerospace Engineering; Combustion
- Workplaces: California Institute of Technology
- Thesis: The Rotational Motion of an Ideal Fluid and Application to the Three-Dimensional Flow through Axial Turbomachinery (1948)
- Doctoral advisor: Theodore von Kármán; Hans W. Liepmann
- Doctoral students: Sébastien Candel; Gary Flandro; Ann Karagozian; Amable Liñán; P. N. Shankar; Donald L. Turcotte

Frank Earl Marble (July 21, 1918 – August 11, 2014) was an American scientist who worked in the field of aerodynamics and combustion. He obtained his Bachelor's degree in Mechanical Engineering in 1940 and Master's degree in Applied Mathematics in 1942, both from Case Institute of Technology. He obtained an engineer's degree in 1947 and PhD in 1948 under the supervision of Theodore von Kármán and Hans W. Liepmann from California Institute of Technology.

Marble worked at Caltech until his retirement in 1989. He was an elected member of National Academy of Engineering (1974) and National Academy of Sciences (1989).
