= Plasma wave instrument =

A plasma wave instrument (PWI), also known as a plasma wave receiver, is a device capable of detecting vibrations in outer space plasma and transforming them into audible sound waves or air vibrations that can be heard by the human ear. This instrument was pioneered by then-University of Iowa physics professor, Donald Gurnett. Plasma wave instruments are commonly employed on space probes such as GEOTAIL, Polar, Voyager I and II (see Plasma Wave Subsystem), and Cassini–Huygens.

== Operating principle ==
Vibrations in the audible frequency range are perceived by humans when air vibrates against their eardrum. Air, or some other vibrating medium such as water, is essential for sound perception by the human ear. Without a medium to transmit it, the sound produced by a source will not be heard by a human. There is no air in outer space, nor is there any other type of medium capable of transmitting vibrations from a source to a human ear. However, there are sources in outer space that vibrate at frequencies audible to humans if only there were some transmitting medium to carry those vibrations from the source to a human eardrum.

One such source capable of vibrating at audible frequencies (ranging from 45 to 20,000 vibrations per second) is plasma. Plasma is a collection of charged particles, such as free electrons or ionized gas atoms. Examples of plasma include solar flares, solar wind, neon signs, and fluorescent lamps. Plasma interacts with electrical and magnetic fields in ways that can result in vibrations across various frequencies, including the audible range.

== Other applications ==
The recordings of interplanetary and outer space plasma vibrations, captured by plasma wave instruments, were provided by NASA to composer Terry Riley and Kronos quartet founder David Harrington as inspiration for the composition of "Sun Rings", a 85-minute multimedia piece for a string quartet and choir. "Sun Rings" was performed November 3, 2006, at the Veteran's Auditorium, in Providence, Rhode Island.
