= Frederick L. Scarf =

American physicist (1930–1988)

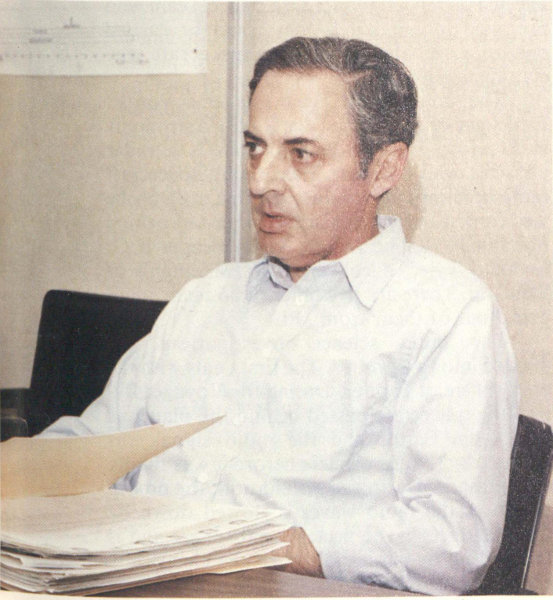
- Scarf in c. 1980
- Born: Frederick Leonard Scarf; July 25, 1930; Philadelphia, Pennsylvania, US
- Died: July 17, 1988 (aged 57); Moscow, USSR
- Education: Temple University (BS); MIT (PhD)
- Known for: Plasma wave spacecraft instruments
- Scientific career
- Fields: Plasma wave physics, space physics
- Workplaces: University of Washington; TRW; UCLA
- Thesis: Retardation effects in the Bethe-Salpeter equation (1955)
- Doctoral advisors: Felix Villars

Frederick Leonard Scarf (July 25, 1930 – July 17, 1988) was an American physicist known for his work in plasma wave physics and his leadership in developing space-based instruments to study the solar wind and planetary magnetospheres. After earning a PhD in physics from the Massachusetts Institute of Technology, he switched to space science in the early 1960s, working for TRW. Scarf played a central role in advocating for and designing plasma wave instruments aboard numerous NASA and international missions, including OGO-5, Pioneer Venus Orbiter, Giotto, ISEE-3, and the Voyager program spacecraft, where he served as the principal investigator for the Plasma Wave Subsystem (PWS).

His innovative conversion of plasma wave data from the Voyager's PWS into audio recordings, called the "sounds of space" by journalists, gained public and scientific attention. A strong proponent of international collaboration, Scarf worked on joint projects with European, Japanese, and Soviet space programs, even during periods of official US policy restrictions. He died suddenly while visiting the Soviet Space Research Institute in Moscow. In recognition of his contributions, he was awarded with two NASA Exceptional Scientific Achievement Medals, and the American Geophysical Union established the Fred L. Scarf Award in his honor.

== Biography ==
Frederick Leonard Scarf was born on July 25, 1930, in Philadelphia, Pennsylvania, the son of Jewish emigrants from Ukraine and Russia, Lene (Elkman) and Louis Scarf. He had a twin brother, mathematical economist Herbert Eli Scarf. He studied physics at Temple University (BSc 1951) and then in Massachusetts Institute of Technology (PhD 1955); he used the Bethe–Salpeter equation to study the deuteron for his thesis. He then became a researcher at the University of Washington, studying theoretical quantum electrodynamics. Around 1959, he took sabbatical and went to CERN. At that time he became interested in space physics. While at CERN, he met a friend from MIT who arranged him a visit to TRW.

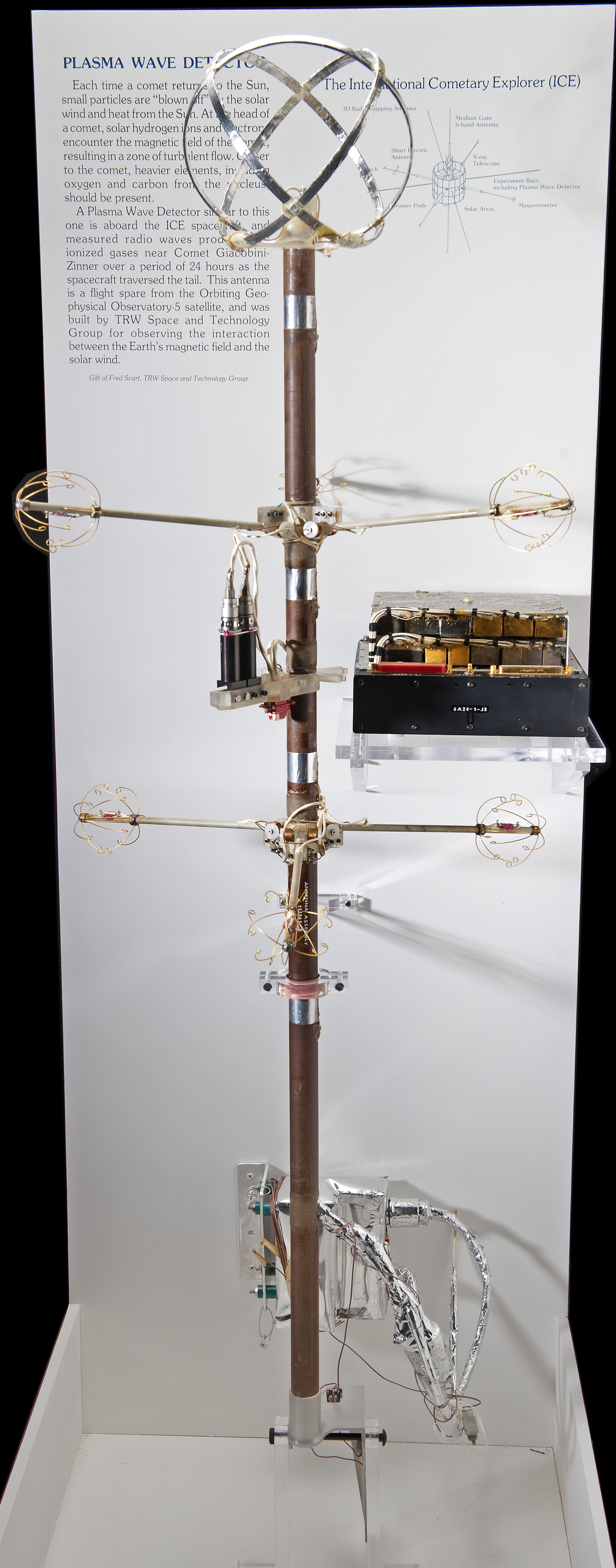
A flight spare for the plasma wave sensor system carried on the OGO-5 satellite. Gift of Fred Scarf to the Smithsonian Air and Space Museum.

In 1962, Scarf left the university to become a researcher at TRW, and then a Chief Scientist for Space Research and Technology in the Applied Technology Division of the TRW Space and Technology Group. Scarf and his colleagues at TRW realized that plasma wave experiments were being overlooked by NASA; they pressed NASA to change it. Scarf was a principal investigator or co-investigator of plasma wave experiments for multiple NASA spacecraft, starting with a plasma wave instrument on OGO-5, which detected "electrostatic waves in a collisionless shock", and then on Pioneer 8, 9, and the Pioneer Venus Orbiter.

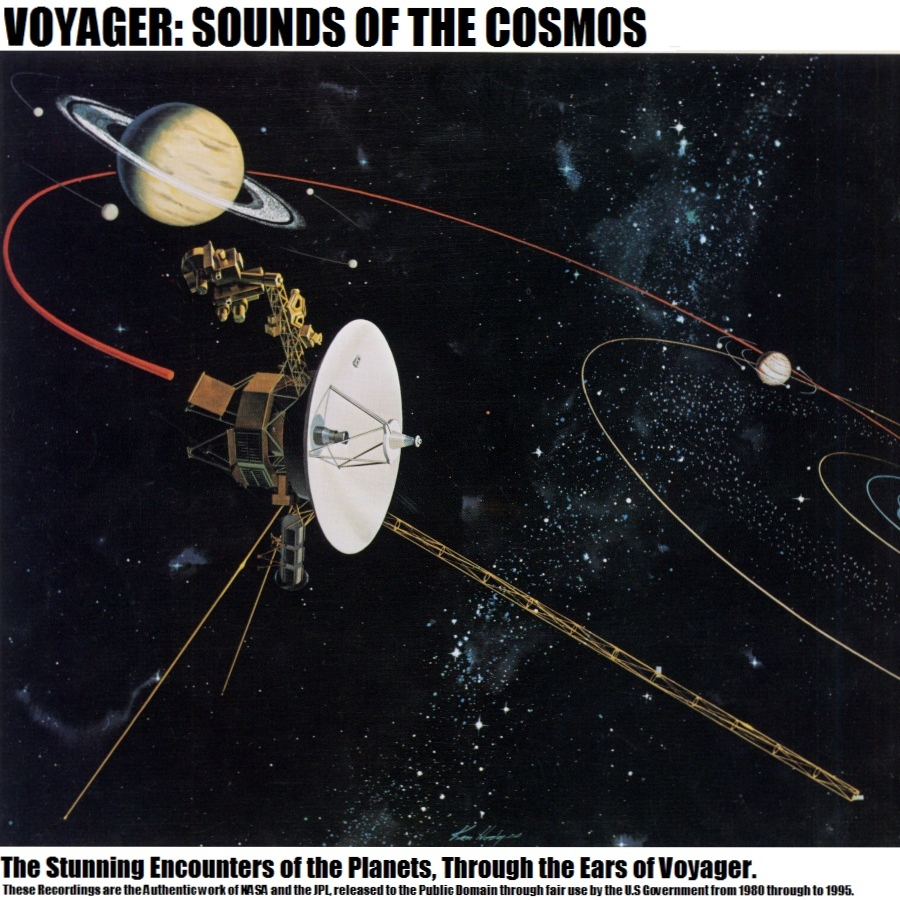
Voyager: Sounds of the Cosmos

Scarf was an advocate of including the plasma wave detector on the Voyager program spacecraft. He became the Principal Investigator (PI) of the Plasma Wave Subsystem (PWS). He developed a way to transform plasma wave measurements into sound, called the "sounds of space" by journalists. M. Mitchell Waldrop described these sounds in a Science article:

Scarf's experiment measures oscillations in the electrically charged plasma surrounding the spacecraft, oscillations whose frequencies happen to fall in the acoustic range. By playing the signal back through a conventional loudspeaker, Scarf creates "the sounds of space," an eerie symphony of hisses, pops, and whistles. Voyager's transit of the bow shock, where the solar wind first encounters the magnetic field of the planet and is forced to flow around, erupts from the speakers as a hoarse roar like the breaking of waves on a beach.
For the Voyager 2 encounter with Saturn, Scarf and his colleagues outdid themselves: they played their data, which were divided into 16 frequency channels, through a 16-channel music synthesizer. The fragment of music that results is fitting accompaniment to Voyager's journey past Saturn. Slowly, dreamily, the midlevel brasses surge and ebb against a deep roll of basses and a high, floating treble. The music lasts for only a minute. But it haunts the mind.

The "sounds of space" were released on cassettes and CDs. After Scarf's death in 1988, Donald Gurnett became the PI of the PWS.

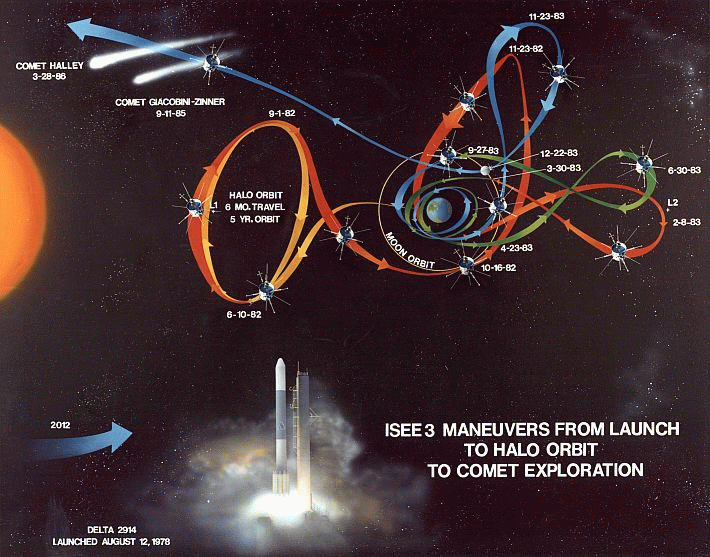
ISEE-3 trajectory

When NASA rejected a space probe mission to Halley's Comet, Scarf, with the help of NASA's Robert W. Farquhar, found a way to bypass bureaucracy "to gain control of an orbiting research satellite that had already outlived its usefulness". ISEE-3 was sent from its L1 point to the comet Giacobini-Zinner in September 1985; Scarf himself told the reporter: “We stole it [the satellite]”. The probe proved that the comet "sends out shock waves as it passes through space". ISEE-3 became the first space probe that studied a comet.

Scarf's student Christopher T. Russell described some of his discoveries:

electrostatic waves at half-harmonics of the electron cyclotron frequency in the magnetospheres of both the Earth and the outer planets, and lightning-generated signals in both the magnetosphere of Jupiter and the ionosphere of Venus

Scarf was known for his "generosity and openness" in sharing his observational data, as a good mentor, and as "a strong advocate of international cooperation in space". He was involved into European space probe missions, like ESA's Giotto mission to Halley's Comet, and played "a key role with the Japanese space program". Scarf also worked on multiple Soviet space missions, like the Soviet Phobos program. When NASA was prohibited to participate in joint Soviet-American space programs, Scarf was one of a few scientists who continued to work with Soviets despite this ruling. To do it, Scarf became a part-time employee of UCLA, that allowed him "to get a grant from NASA to continue his work with the Soviets". One time he attempted to make NASA donate a spare Voyager instrument to the Soviets to continue research, but NASA refused. Similar instrument was then transferred by ESA, which asked Scarf to be a co-investigator. He was a member of multiple groups and committees, including the interagency Consultative Group, on the Space Science Board and its Committee on Solar and Space Physics, in the committee of the National Academy of Sciences study of Space Science in the Twenty-First Century, a member of the Committee on Solar-Terrestrial Research of the National Research Council, for which he served as a chairman in 1974–79.

== Personal life and death ==
Scarf died suddenly on July 17, 1988, while visiting the Soviet Space Research Institute in Moscow. He had no health issues; a brain tumor was suspected but no official cause of death was published. In Moscow, Scarf was involved in planning of further Soviet Mars missions.

Russell wrote that colleagues would miss Scarf's "openness, advice, perseverance, amiability, sound judgment, humor, and enthusiasm" and called him "a true romantic of the space age who loved space science with a rare passion".

Scarf was married and had four children.

== Awards and recognition ==
Scarf was "widely regarded as the world’s leading expert" in plasma wave physics and in solar wind. His obituary states that "Fred's name was synonymous, for a quarter century, with the most ubiquitous transient phenomena in solar system plasmas: electrostatic plasma waves".

Scarf was awarded NASA Exceptional Scientific Achievement Medal in 1981 and 1986.

The American Geophysical Union established the Fred L. Scarf Award annually "in recognition of an outstanding dissertation that contributes directly to solar-planetary science", which is given annually.

== Discography ==
- Sounds of Saturn, 1982
- Uranus Sounds From Space, 1986

== Selected publications ==
- Scarf, Frederick L. (1958). "New Soluble Energy Band Problem". Physical Review. 112 (4): 1137–1140. Bibcode:1958PhRv..112.1137S. doi:10.1103/PhysRev.112.1137.
- Scarf, F. L. (1966), Wave-particle interactions in the solar wind
- Scarf, Frederick L. (1970). "Microscopic structure of the solar wind". Space Science Reviews. 11 (2–3): 234. Bibcode:1970SSRv...11..234S. doi:10.1007/BF00241523.
- Scarf, Frederick L.; Wolfe, John H. (1974). "Pioneer 9 Plasma wave and solar plasma measurements for the August 1972 storm period". Journal of Geophysical Research. 79 (28): 4179–4185. Bibcode:1974JGR....79.4179S. doi:10.1029/JA079i028p04179.
- Scarf, Frederick L. (1974). "A new model for the high-frequency decametric radiation from Jupiter". Journal of Geophysical Research. 79 (25): 3835–3839. Bibcode:1974JGR....79.3835S. doi:10.1029/JA079i025p03835.
- Scarf, Frederick L.; Gurnett, Donald A. (1977). "A plasma wave investigation for the Voyager Mission". Space Science Reviews. 21 (3): 289. Bibcode:1977SSRv...21..289S. doi:10.1007/BF00211543.
- Taylor, William W. L.; Scarf, Frederick L.; Russell, Christopher T.; Brace, Larry H. (1979). "Evidence for lightning on Venus". Nature. 279 (5714): 614–616. Bibcode:1979Natur.279..614T. doi:10.1038/279614a0.
- Scarf, Frederick L. (1979). "Possible traversals of Jupiter's distant magnetic tail by Voyager and by Saturn". Journal of Geophysical Research: Space Physics. 84: 4422–4424. Bibcode:1979JGR....84.4422S. doi:10.1029/JA084iA08p04422.
- Kurth, W. S.; Gurnett, D. A.; Scarf, F. L.; Poynter, R. L.; Sullivan, J. D. (1979). "Voyager observations of Jupiter's distant magnetotail". Journal of Geophysical Research: Space Physics. 86: 8402–8412. doi:10.1029/JA086iA10p08402.
- Scarf, Frederick L.; Gurnett, Donald A.; Kurth, William S. (1979). "Jupiter Plasma Wave Observations: An Initial Voyager 1 Overview". Science. 204 (4396): 991–995. Bibcode:1979Sci...204..991S. doi:10.1126/science.204.4396.991. PMID 17800437.
- Scarf, Frederick L.; Coroniti, Ferdinand V.; Kennel, Charles F.; Gurnett, Donald A.; Ip, Wing-Huen; Smith, Edward J.; Smith, E. J. (1986). "Plasma Wave Observations at Comet Giacobini-Zinner". Science. 232 (4748): 377–381. Bibcode:1986Sci...232..377S. doi:10.1126/science.232.4748.377. PMID 17792149.
- Scarf, Frederick (2013). "Plasma Wave Observations at Comets Giacobini-Zinner and Halley". Plasma Waves and Instabilities at Comets and in Magnetospheres. Geophysical Monograph Series. pp. 31–40. doi:10.1029/GM053p0031. ISBN 978-1-118-66419-3.
