= Pioneer Venus Orbiter =

NASA orbiter mission to Venus (1978–1992)

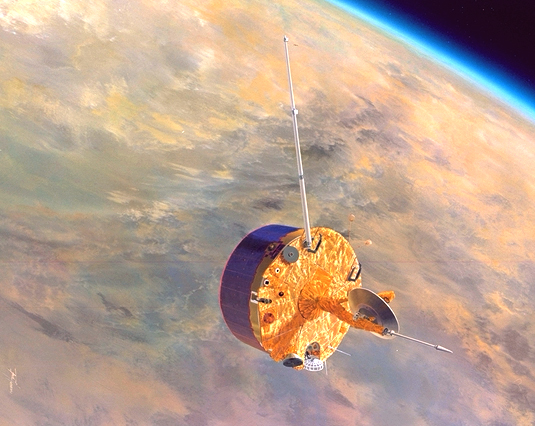
- Artist's impression of Pioneer 12 in orbit above Venus
- Names: Pioneer Venus 1 Pioneer 12
- Mission type: Venus orbiter
- Operator: NASA / Ames
- COSPAR ID: 1978-051A
- SATCAT no.: 10911
- Website: science.nasa.gov
- Mission duration: Total: 14 years, 4 months and 18 days Science phase: 13 years, 10 months and 4 days

Spacecraft properties
- Bus: HS-507
- Manufacturer: Hughes
- Launch mass: 582 kg (1,283 lb)
- Dry mass: 517 kg (1,140 lb)
- Dimensions: 2.5 × 2.5 × 1.2 m (8.2 × 8.2 × 3.9 ft)
- Power: 312 watts

Start of mission
- Launch date: May 20, 1978, 13:13:00 UTC
- Rocket: Atlas SLV-3D Centaur-D1AR (AC-50)
- Launch site: Cape Canaveral LC-36A

End of mission
- Disposal: Decommissioned
- Last contact: October 8, 1992, 19:22 UTC
- Decay date: October 22, 1992

Orbital parameters
- Reference system: Cytherocentric
- Semi-major axis: 33,405.8 km (20,757.4 mi)
- Eccentricity: 0.842
- Pericytherion altitude: 181.6 km (112.8 mi)
- Apocytherion altitude: 66,630 km (41,400 mi)
- Inclination: 105 degrees
- Period: 24 hours
- Epoch: 22 November 1979, 11:53:20 UTC

Venus orbiter
- Orbital insertion: December 4, 1978

The Pioneer Venus Orbiter, also known as Pioneer Venus 1 or Pioneer 12, was a mission to Venus conducted by NASA as part of the Pioneer Venus project. Launched in May 1978 atop an Atlas-Centaur rocket, the spacecraft was inserted into an elliptical orbit around Venus on December 4, 1978. It returned data from Venus until October 1992.

The spacecraft conducted radar altimetry observations allowing the first global topographic map of the Venusian surface to be constructed.

== Spacecraft ==
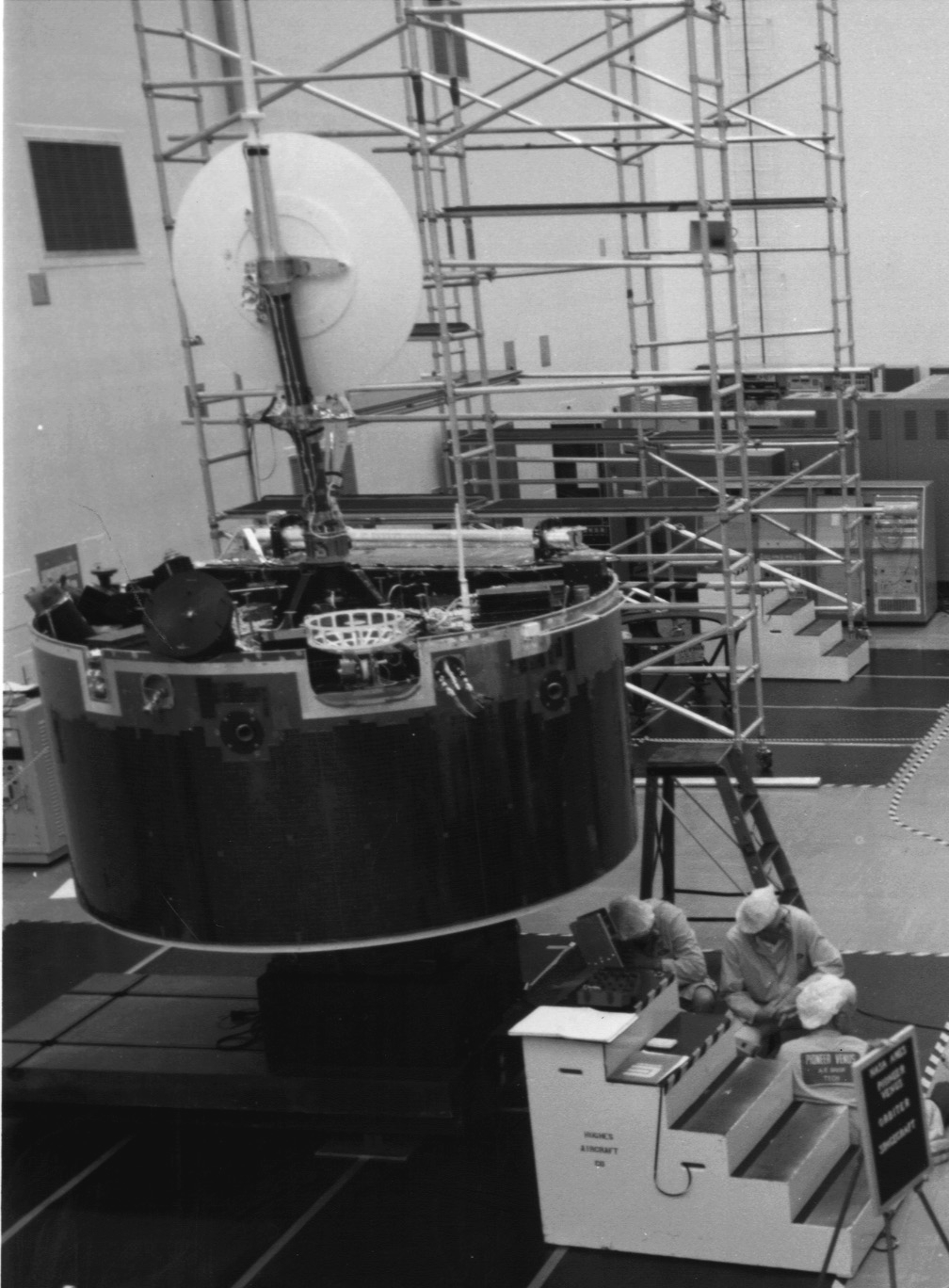
Pioneer Venus 1 at KSC.

Manufactured by Hughes Aircraft Company, the Pioneer Venus Orbiter was based on the HS-507 bus. The spacecraft was a flat cylinder, 2.5 meters (8.2 ft) in diameter and 1.2 meters (3.9 ft) long. All instruments and spacecraft subsystems were mounted on the forward end of the cylinder, except the magnetometer, which was at the end of a 4.7 meters (15 ft) boom. A solar array extended around the circumference of the cylinder. A 1.09 metres (3 ft 7 in) despun dish antenna provided S and X band communication with Earth. A Star 24 solid rocket motor was integrated into the spacecraft to provide the thrust to enter orbit around Venus.

=== Instruments ===
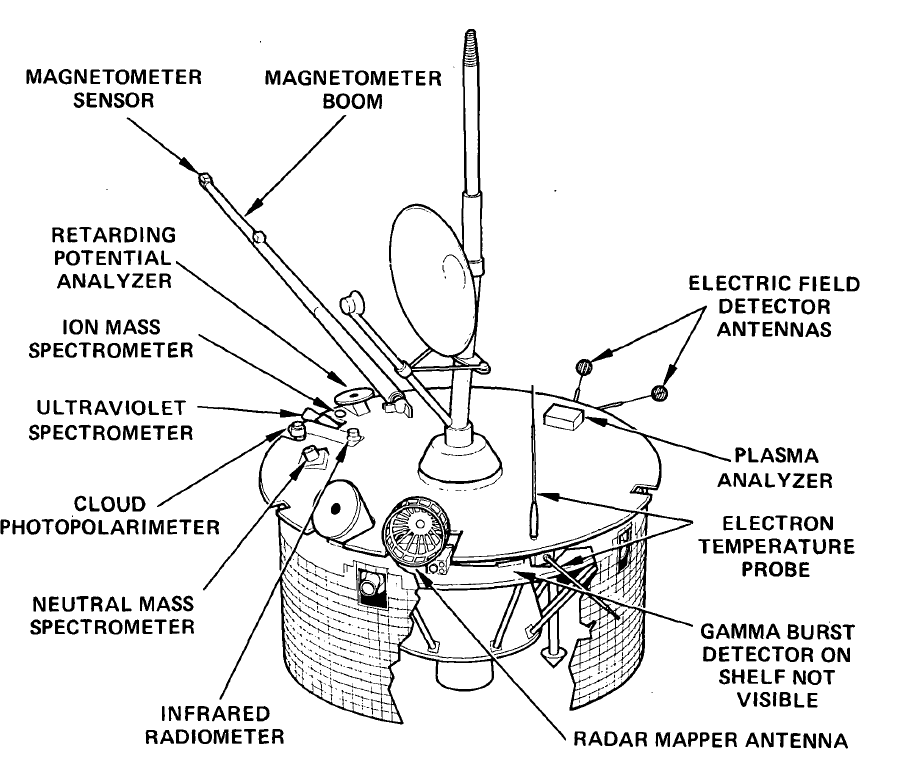
Pioneer Venus Orbiter Instruments

The Pioneer Venus Orbiter carried 17 experiments with a total mass of 45 kilograms (99 lb):

==== Orbiter Cloud Photopolarimeter (OCPP) ====
The Orbiter Cloud Photopolarimeter was used to measure the vertical distribution of clouds on Venus. It was a photo-polarimeter built by the Goddard Institute for Space Studies (GISS), similar to Pioneer 10 and Pioneer 11 imaging photopolarimeter (IPP), and operating on four spectral bands (255-285, 355-380, 540-555, and 930-945 nm). The principal investigator was J. Hansen, later succeeded by L. Travis. The instrument had a mass of 4 kilograms and consumed 5.4 watts of power.

==== Orbiter Radar Mapper Instrument (ORAD) ====
The Orbiter Radar Mapper Instrument was designed to determine the topography and surface characteristics of Venus. It was a radar system developed by the Massachusetts Institute of Technology (MIT), with G. Pettengill serving as the principal investigator. Weighing 10.9 kilograms and consuming 23 watts, the instrument operated when the spacecraft was within 4,700 kilometres (2,900 mi) of the planet. It transmitted a 20-watt S-band signal at 1.757 Gigahertz and achieved a surface mapping resolution of 23 by 7 kilometres (14.3 mi × 4.3 mi) at periapsis.

==== Orbiter Infrared Radiometer (OIR) ====
The Orbiter Infrared Radiometer was used to measure infrared emissions from Venus's atmosphere. It was constructed by the Jet Propulsion Laboratory (JPL), and the principal investigator was F. Taylor. The instrument had a mass of 5.0 kilograms and required 5.5 watts of power.

==== Orbiter Ultraviolet Spectrometer (OUVS) ====
The Orbiter Ultraviolet Spectrometer measured scattered and emitted ultraviolet light from Venus. Built by the Laboratory for Atmospheric and Space Physics (LASP), its principal investigator was A.I.F. Stewart. The spectrometer weighed 3.1 kilograms and consumed 1.7 watts of power.

==== Orbiter Neutral Mass Spectrometer (ONMS) ====
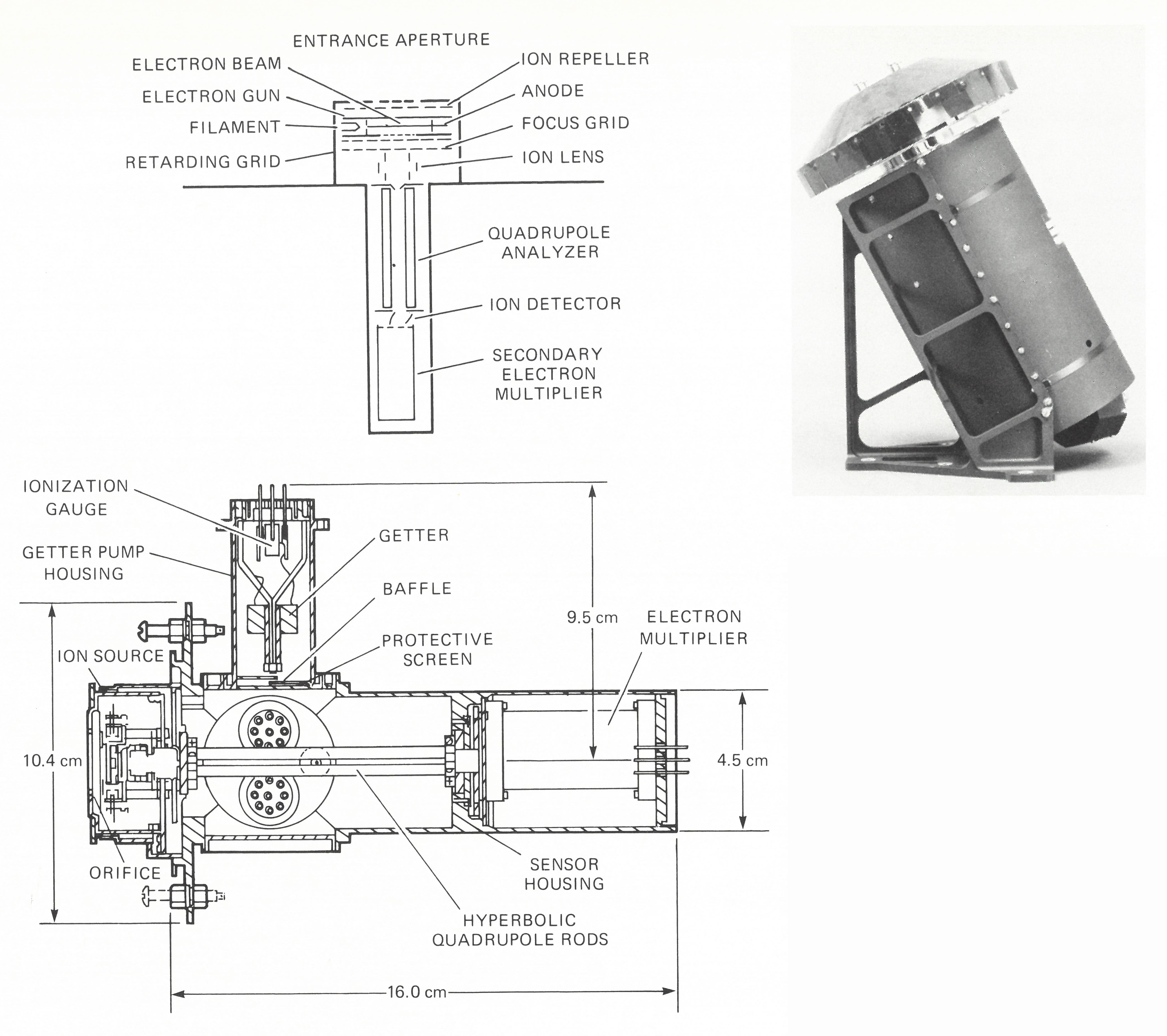
Orbiter Neutral Mass Spectrometer (ONMS)

The Orbiter Neutral Mass Spectrometer was used to determine the composition of Venus's upper atmosphere. Manufactured by the Goddard Space Flight Center (GSFC), it was managed by principal investigator H. Neimann. The instrument had a mass of 4.3 kilograms and consumed 11.2 watts.

==== Orbiter Plasma Analyzer (OPA) ====
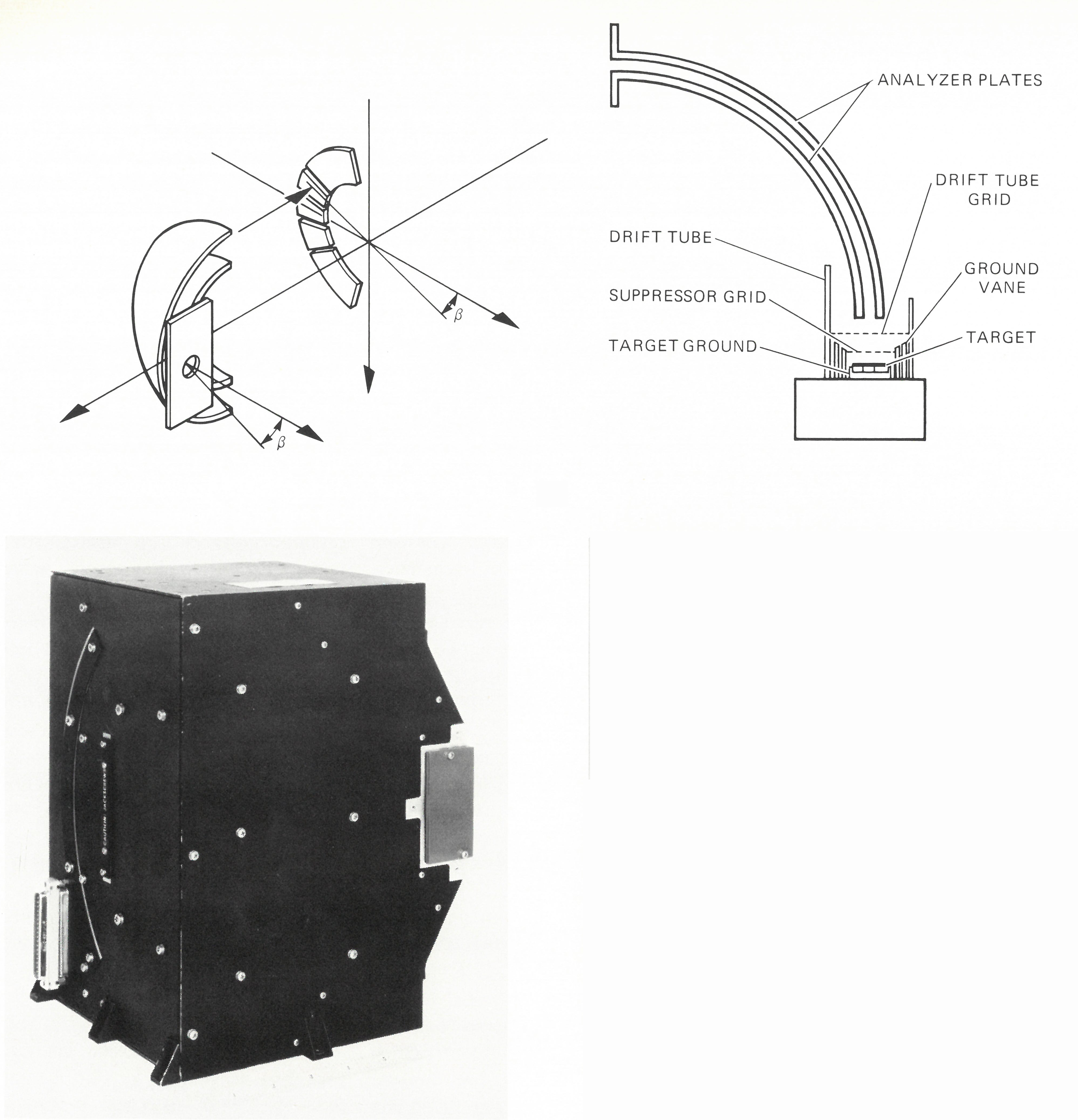
Orbiter Plasma Analyzer (OPA)

The Orbiter Plasma Analyzer measured properties of the solar wind. Developed at the Ames Research Center (ARC), the instrument was led by principal investigator J. Wolfe, who was later succeeded by A. Barnes. It had a mass of 3.7 kilograms and required 4.5 watts of power.

==== Orbiter Magnetometer (OMAG) ====
The Orbiter Magnetometer was designed to characterize Venus’s magnetic field. It was built by the University of California, Los Angeles (UCLA), with C. Russell as the principal investigator. The 2-kilogram instrument consumed 3 watts of power and was mounted on a 4.7-meter boom to reduce spacecraft interference.

==== Orbiter Electric Field Detector (OEFD) ====
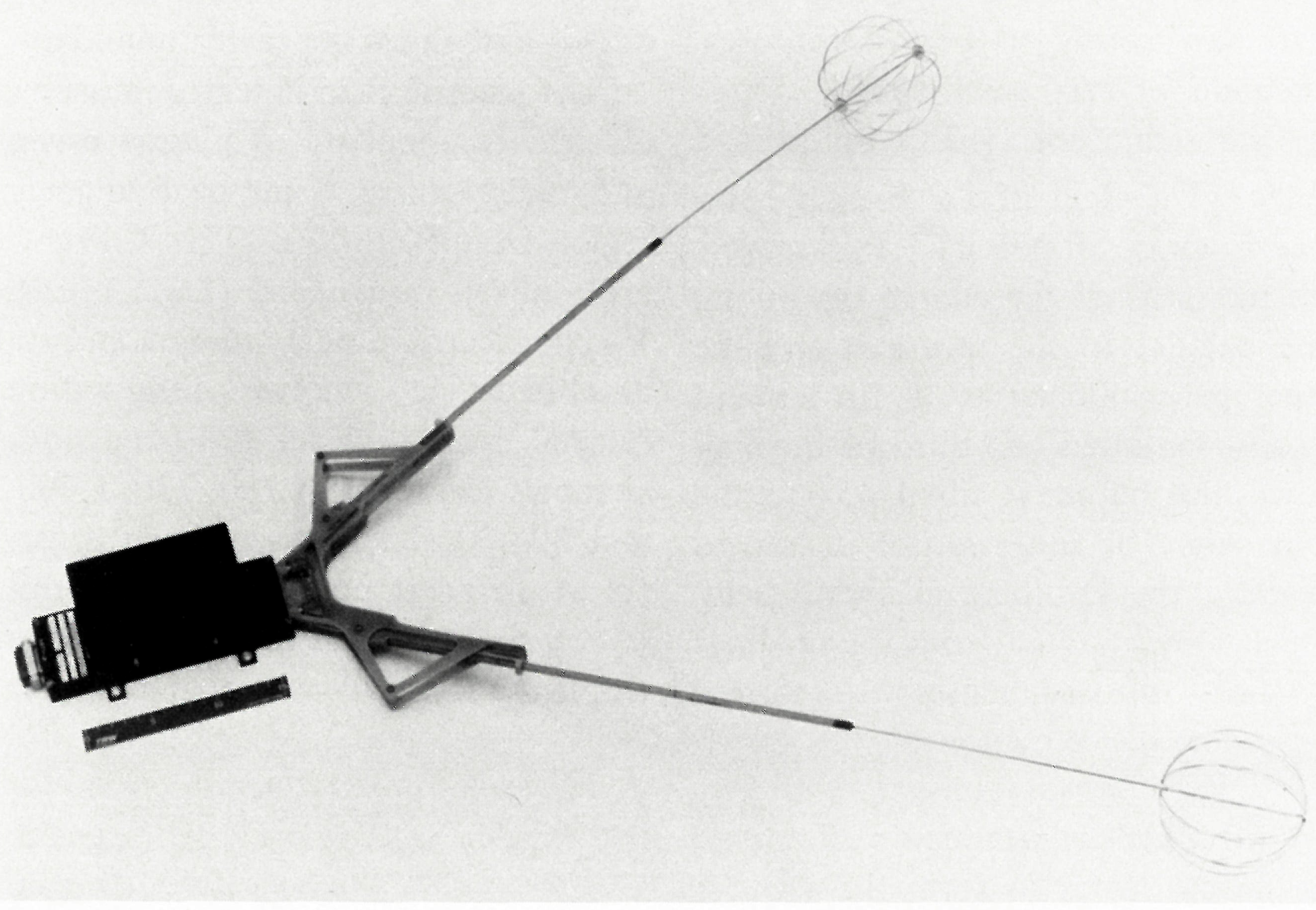
Orbiter Electric Field Detector (OEFD)

The Orbiter Electric Field Detector studied electric fields in the Venusian environment. Built by TRW and led by principal investigator F. Scarf, it had a mass of 0.7 kilograms and used only 0.6 watts of power.

==== Orbiter Electron Temperature Probe (OETP) ====
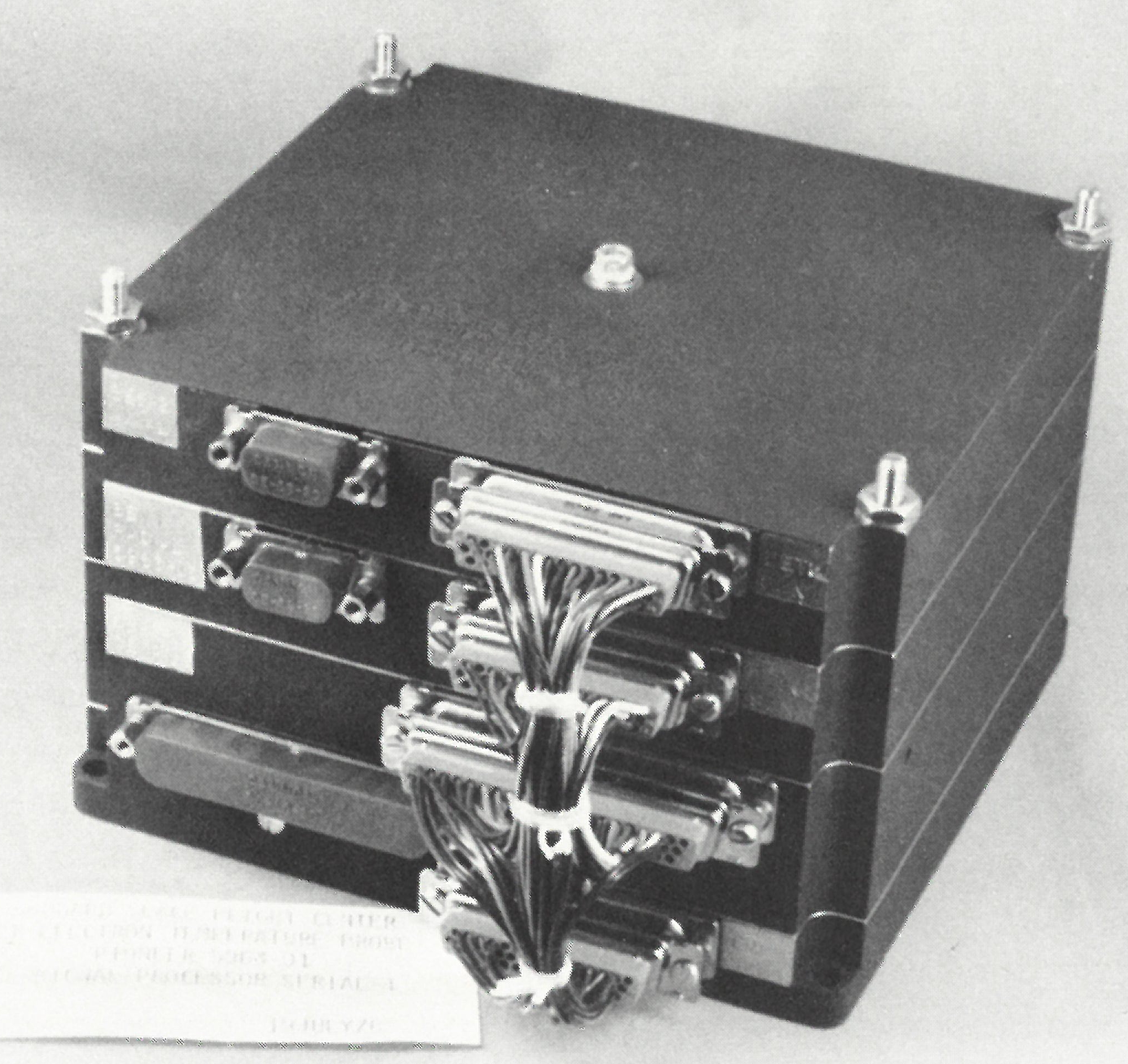
Orbiter Electron Temperature Probe (OETP)

The Orbiter Electron Temperature Probe investigated the thermal properties of Venus’s ionosphere. It was developed by the Goddard Space Flight Center (GSFC) under the direction of principal investigator L. Brace. The probe had a mass of 2.0 kilograms and consumed 4.0 watts.

==== Orbiter Ion Mass Spectrometer (OIMS) ====
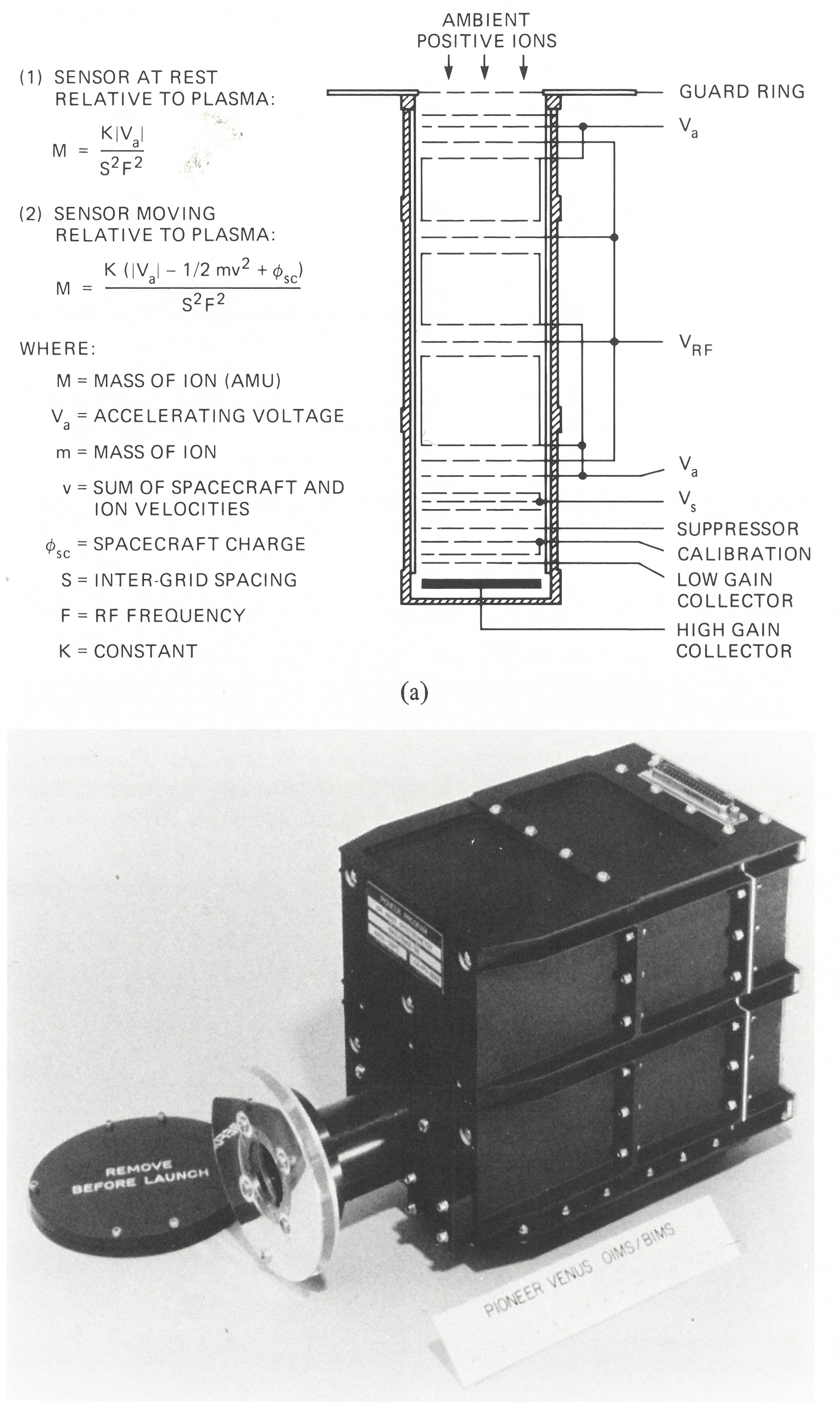
Orbiter Ion Mass Spectrometer (OIMS)

The Orbiter Ion Mass Spectrometer was used to characterize the ion population in the ionosphere of Venus. Built by the Goddard Space Flight Center (GSFC), it was managed by principal investigator H. Taylor. The instrument had a mass of 2.9 kilograms and required 1.5 watts of power.

==== Orbiter Retarding Potential Analyzer (ORPA) ====
The Orbiter Retarding Potential Analyzer studied ionospheric particles. It was developed at the Lockheed Palo Alto Research Laboratory (LPARL), with W. Knudsen as the principal investigator. This instrument weighed 2.7 kilograms and consumed 2.8 watts of power.

==== Orbiter Gamma-Ray Burst Detector (OGBD) ====
The Orbiter Gamma-Ray Burst Detector recorded gamma-ray burst events. It was constructed by the Los Alamos Scientific Laboratory (LASL), and W. Evans served as the principal investigator. The instrument had a mass of 2.8 kilograms.

=== Experiments ===
The orbiter also performed in situ radio science experiments:

==== Orbiter Atmospheric Propagation Experiment (OGPE) ====
The OGPE utilized dual-frequency radio signals to investigate how Venus's atmosphere affects radio wave propagation. By analyzing signal attenuation and phase shifts, the experiment aimed to deduce atmospheric properties such as electron density and refractive index. This information is crucial for understanding the structure and composition of Venus's ionosphere. T. Croft from SRI was the principal investigator.

==== Orbiter Atmospheric Drag Experiment (OAD) ====
The OAD measured the deceleration of the spacecraft due to atmospheric drag at the fringes of Venus's atmosphere. By tracking changes in the spacecraft's velocity, the experiment provided data on atmospheric density and its variations with altitude and solar activity. G. Keating from LRC was the principal investigator.

==== Differential Long Baseline Interferometry (DLBI) ====
DLBI, also known as delta-VLBI, involved simultaneous observations of the spacecraft's radio signals by widely separated Earth-based antennas. By measuring the time difference in signal arrival, the experiment achieved precise spacecraft positioning, enhancing orbit determination and navigation accuracy.

==== Orbiter Atmospheric and Solar Wind Turbulence Experiment (OTUR) ====
OTUR focused on detecting and analyzing turbulence in Venus's upper atmosphere and the solar wind. By examining fluctuations in radio signal properties, the experiment aimed to understand the dynamic interactions between the solar wind and Venus's ionosphere. T. Croft from SRI was the principal investigator.

==== Orbiter Dual-Frequency Occultation (ORO) ====
The ORO experiment employed radio occultation techniques, where the spacecraft's radio signals passed through Venus's atmosphere to Earth. By analyzing changes in signal frequency and amplitude, the experiment derived vertical profiles of atmospheric temperature, pressure, and electron density. A. Kliore from JPL was the principal investigator.

==== Orbiter Internal Density Distribution Experiment (OIDD) ====
OIDD aimed to map Venus's gravitational field by tracking the spacecraft's orbit perturbations. Variations in gravity indicated differences in mass distribution within the planet, providing insights into its internal structure and composition. R. Phillips from JPL was the principal investigator.

==== Orbiter Celestial Mechanics Experiment (OCM) ====
The OCM focused on precise measurements of the spacecraft's trajectory to study Venus's gravitational field and test aspects of celestial mechanics. Data from this experiment contributed to refining models of planetary motion and gravitational interactions. I. Shapiro from MIT was the principal investigator

=== Table ===
Instrument and experience details
Name	Complete	Studied	Instrument Type	Manufacturer	Responsible scientist	Mass	Electrical consumption
OCPP	Orbiter Cloud Photopolarimeter	Clouds	Photo polarimeter	GISS	J. Hansen (later L. Travis)	5 kg (11 lb)	5.4 W
ORAD	Orbiter Radar Mapper Instrument	Surface and interior	Radar	MIT	G. Pettengill	9 kg (20 lb)	18 W
OIR	Orbiter Infrared Radiometer	Thermal balance	Infrared radiometer	JPL	F. Taylor	5.9 kg (13 lb)	5.2 W
OUVS	Orbiter Ultraviolet Spectrometer	Composition and structure of the atmosphere	Ultraviolet spectrometer	LASP	A.I.F. Stewart	3.1 kg (6.8 lb)	1.7 W
ONMS	Orbiter Neutral Mass Spectrometer	Composition and structure of the atmosphere	Neutral mass spectrometer	GSFC	H. Neimann	3.8 kg (8.4 lb)	12 W
OPA	Orbiter Plasma Analyzer	Solar wind and ionosphere	Plasma analyzer	ARC	J. Wolfe (later A. Barnes)	3.9 kg (8.6 lb)	5 W
OMAG	Orbiter Magnetometer	Solar wind and ionosphere	Magnetometer	UCLA	C. Russell	2 kg (4.4 lb)	2.2 W
OEFD	Orbiter Electric Field Detector	Solar wind and ionosphere	Measure the electric fields of Venus	TRW	Frederick L. Scarf	0.8 kg (1.8 lb)	0.7 W
OETP	Orbiter Electron Temperature Probe	Solar wind and ionosphere	Electron temperature gauge	GSFC	L. Brace	2.2 kg (4.9 lb)	4.8 W
OIMS	Orbiter Ion Mass Spectrometer	Solar wind and ionosphere	Ion mass spectrometer	GSFC	H. Taylor	3 kg (6.6 lb)	1.5 W
ORPA	Orbiter Retarding Potential Analyzer	Solar wind and ionosphere	Ion charge meter	LPARL	W. Knudsen	2.8 kg (6.2 lb)	2.4 W
OGBD	Orbiter Gamma-Ray Burst Detector	High-energy astronomy	Gamma-ray burst detector	LASL	W. Evans	2.8 kg (6.2 lb)	1.3 W
ORO	Orbiter Dual-Frequency Occultation	Solar wind and ionosphere	Radio science experiments	-	A. Kliore (JPL)	–	-
OGPE	Orbiter Dual-Frequency Experiments	Composition and structure of the atmosphere	Radio science experiments	-	T. Croft (SRI)	–	-
OTUR	Atmospheric and Solar Wind Turbulence Experiment	Dynamics	Radio science experiments	-	T. Croft (JPL)	–	-
OAD	Orbiter Atmospheric Drag Experiment	Composition and structure of the atmosphere	Radio science experiments	-	G. Keating (LRC)	–	-
OIDD	Orbiter Internal Density Distribution Experiment	Surface and interior	Radio science experiments	-	R. Phillips (JPL)	–	-
OCM	Orbiter Celestial Mechanics Experiment	Surface and interior	Radio science experiments	-	I. Shapiro (MIT)	–	-

Note: LASP: Laboratory for Atmospheric and Space Physics (University of Boulder, Colorado); UCLA: University of California in Los Angeles; JPL: Jet Propulsion Laboratory; MIT: Massachusetts Institute of Technology; GSFC: Goddard Space Flight Center GISS: Goddard Institute for Space Studies; LRC: Langley Research Center; ARC: Ames Research Center; LASL: Los Alamos National Laboratory; SRI: Stanford Research Institute

== Mission ==
=== Launch and arrival at Venus ===
The Pioneer Venus Orbiter was launched by an Atlas SLV-3D Centaur-D1AR rocket, which flew from Launch Complex 36A at the Cape Canaveral Air Force Station. The launch occurred at 13:13:00 (8:13 a.m. local time) on May 20, 1978, and deployed the Orbiter into heliocentric orbit for its coast to Venus. Venus orbit insertion occurred on December 4, 1978.

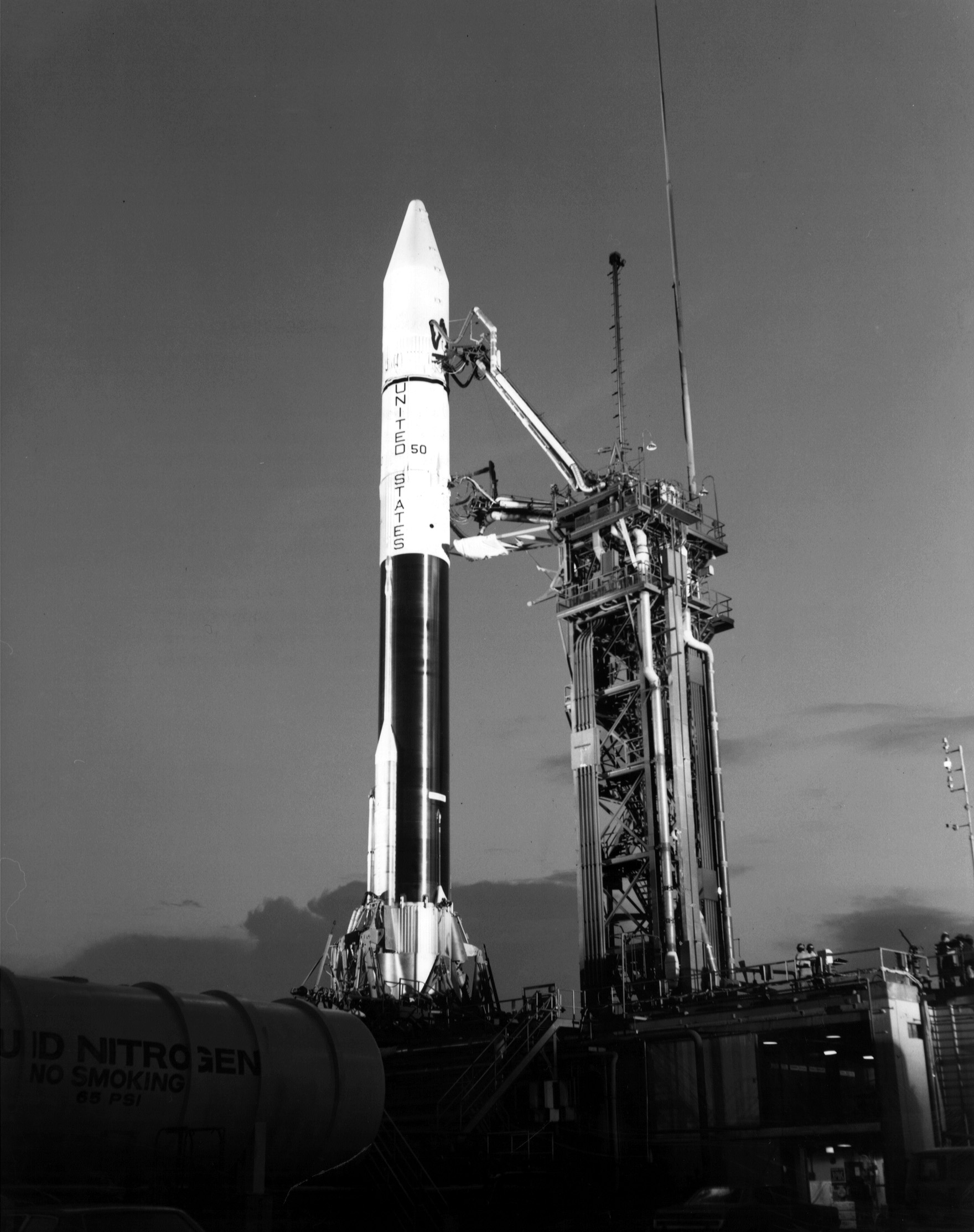
Launch of Pioneer Venus Orbiter with Atlas-Centaur rocket

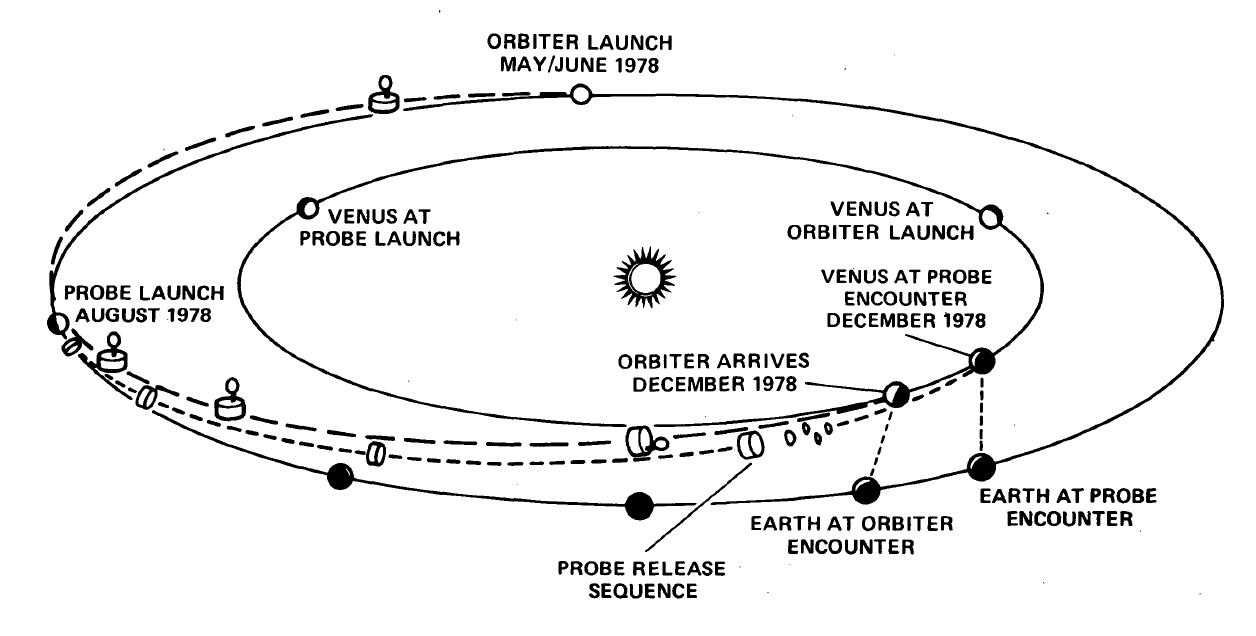
Trajectory of Pioneer Venus Orbiter

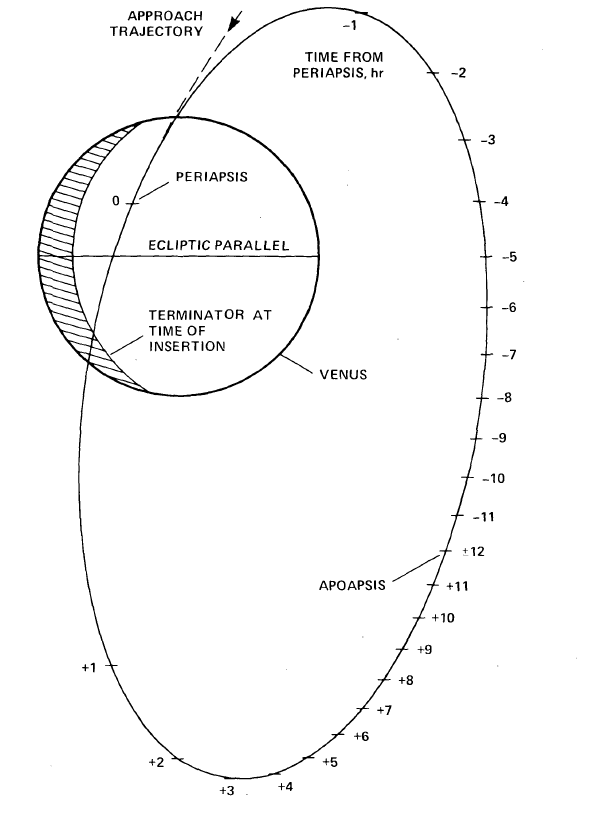
Orbit of Pioneer Venus Orbiter

=== Observation of Venus ===
From Venus orbit insertion to July 1980, periapsis was held between 142 and 253 kilometres (88 and 157 mi) (at 17 degrees north latitude) to facilitate radar and ionospheric measurements. The spacecraft was in a 24-hour orbit with an apoapsis of 66,900 kilometers (41,600 mi). Thereafter, the periapsis was allowed to rise to a maximum of 2,290 kilometres (1,420 mi) and then fall, to conserve fuel.

In 1991, the Radar Mapper was reactivated to investigate previously inaccessible southern portions of the planet, in conjunction with the recently arrived Magellan spacecraft. In May 1992, the probe began the final phase of its mission, in which the periapsis was held between 150 and 250 kilometres (93 and 155 mi), until the spacecraft's propellant was exhausted, after which the orbit decayed naturally. The spacecraft continued to return data until 8 October 1992, with the last signals being received at 19:22 UTC. The Pioneer Venus Orbiter disintegrated upon entering the atmosphere of Venus on October 22, 1992.

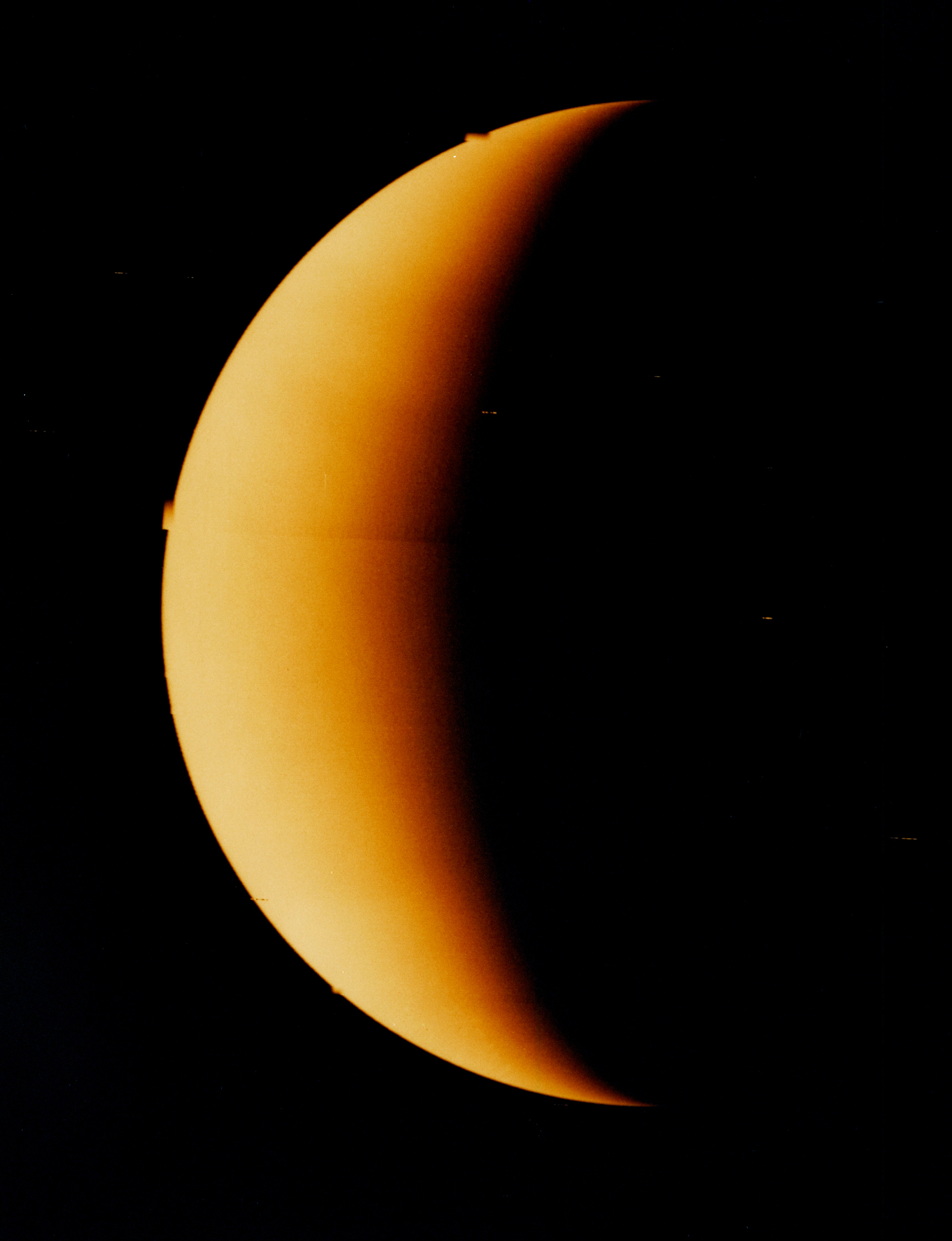
Venus by Pioneer Venus Orbiter (13 December 1978)

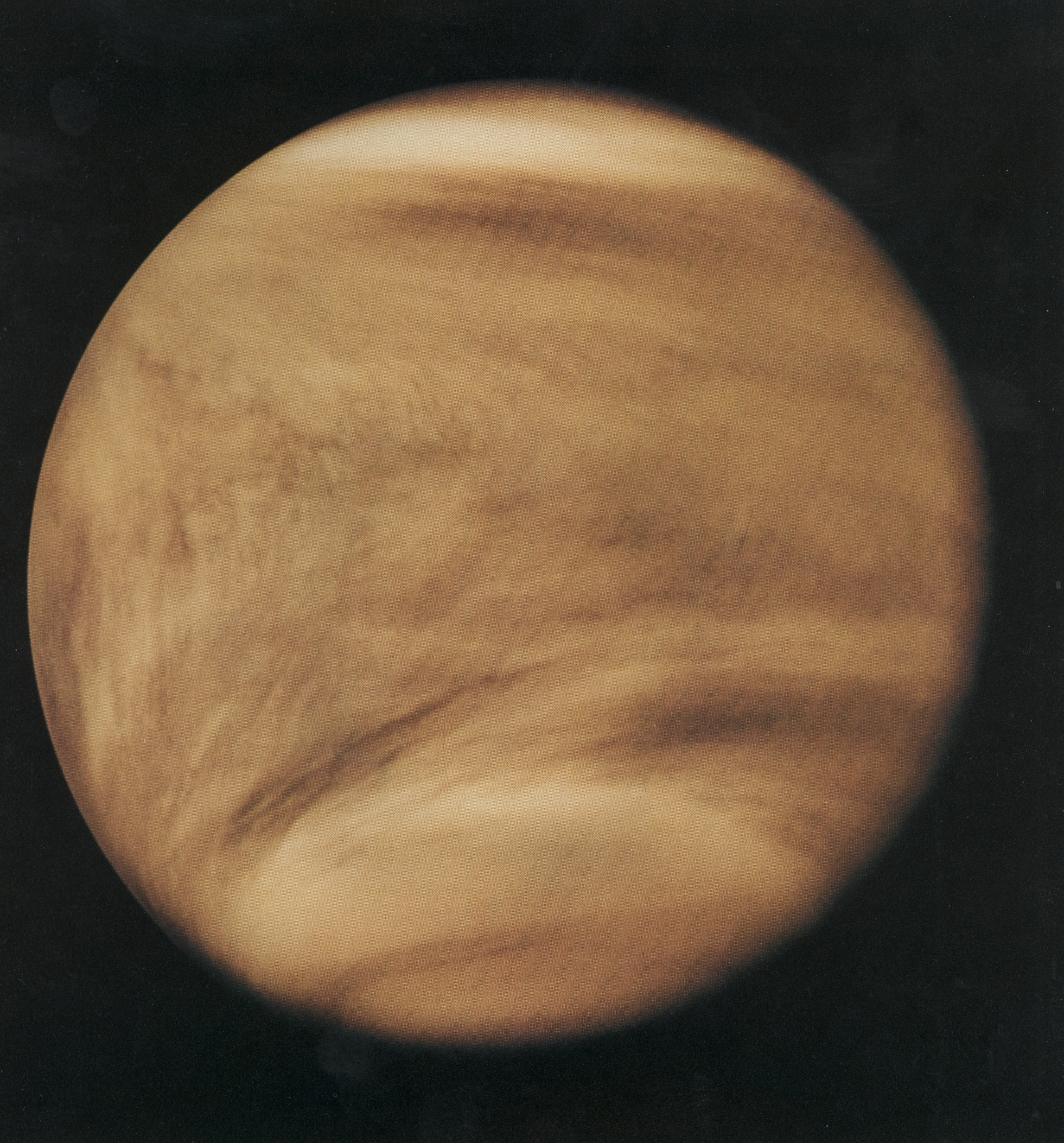
Venus in ultraviolet light by Pioneer Venus Orbiter (February 5, 1979)

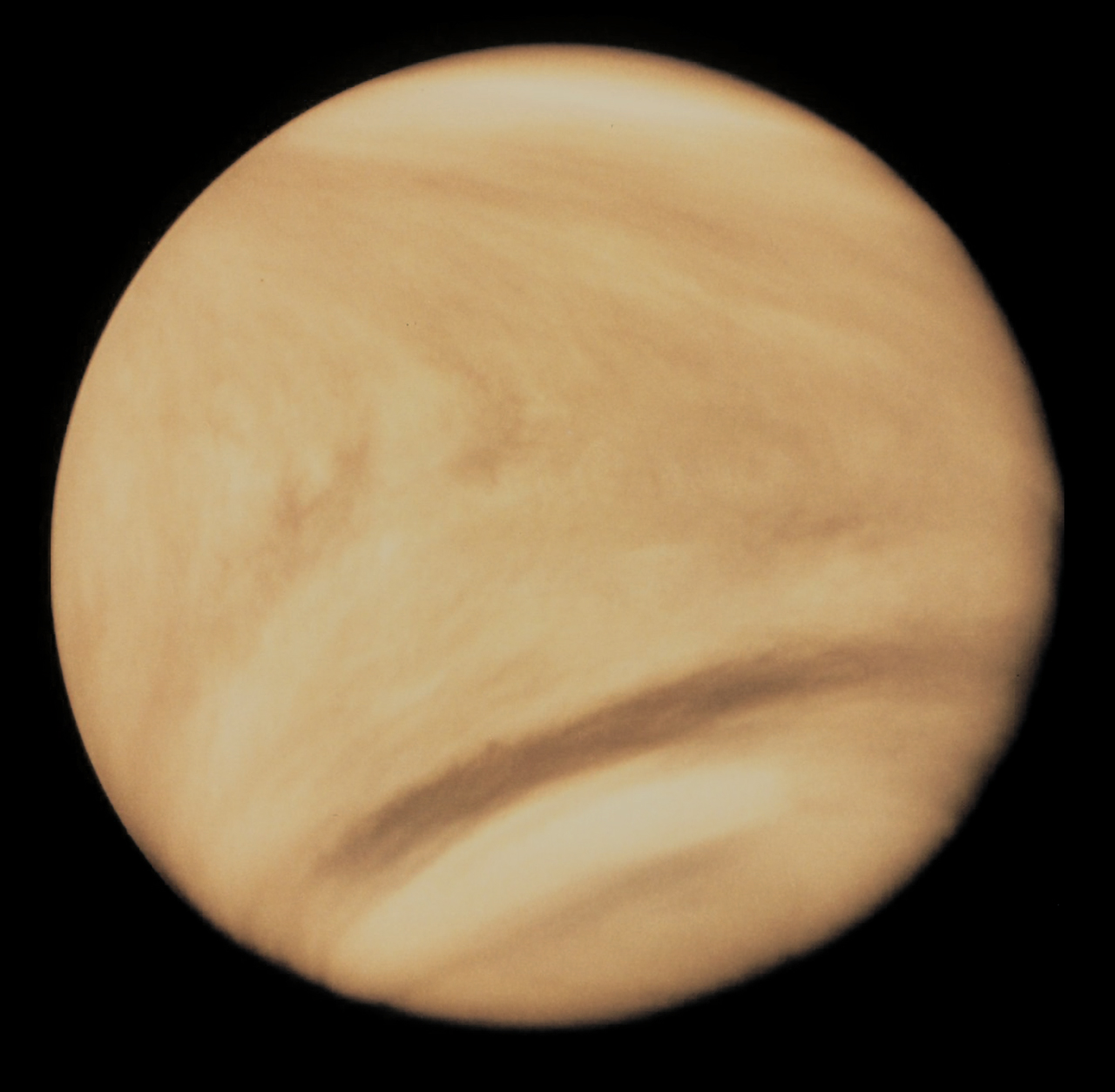
Venus in ultraviolet light by Pioneer Venus Orbiter (February 10, 1979)

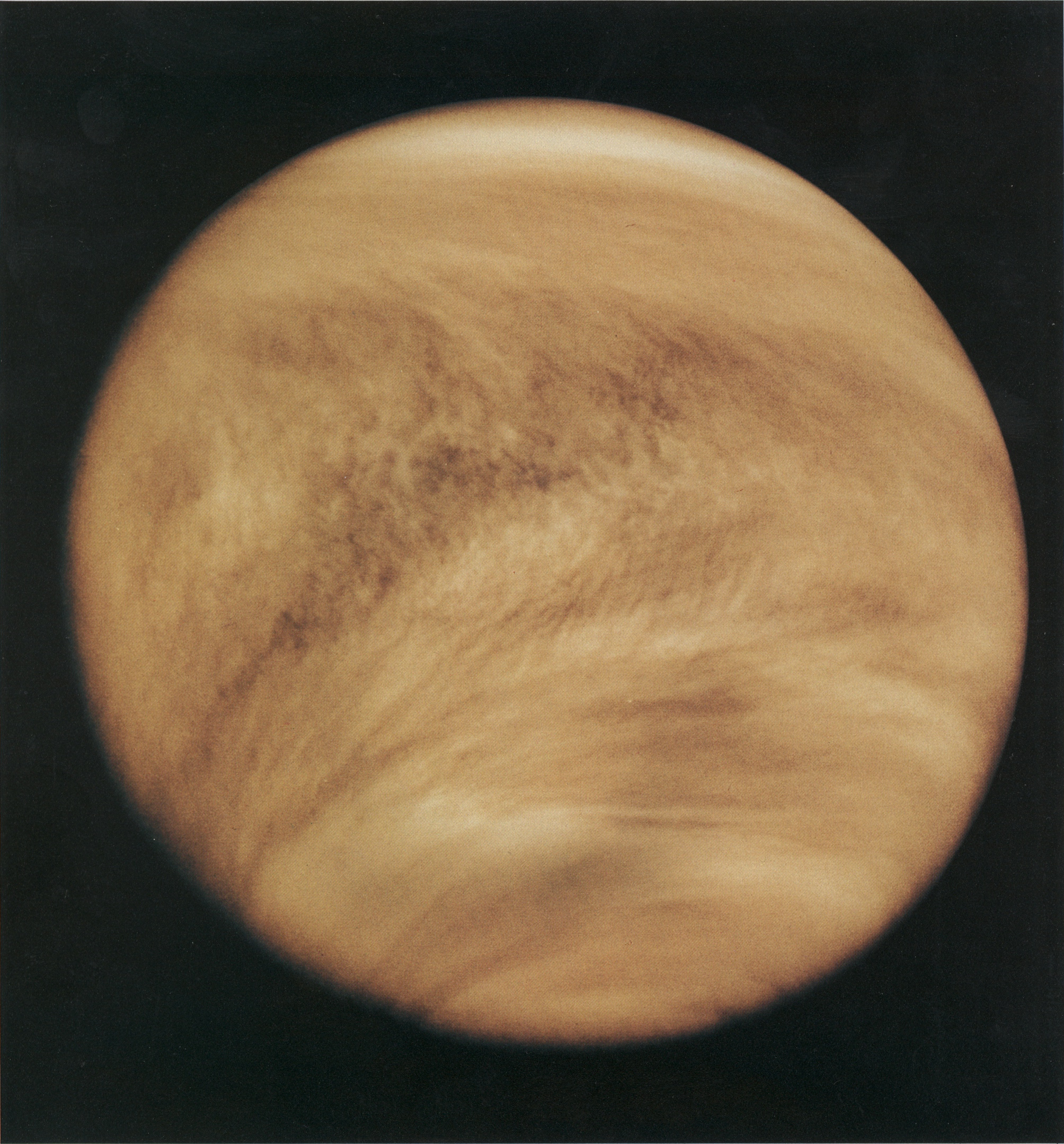
Venus in ultraviolet light by Pioneer Venus Orbiter (February 26, 1979)

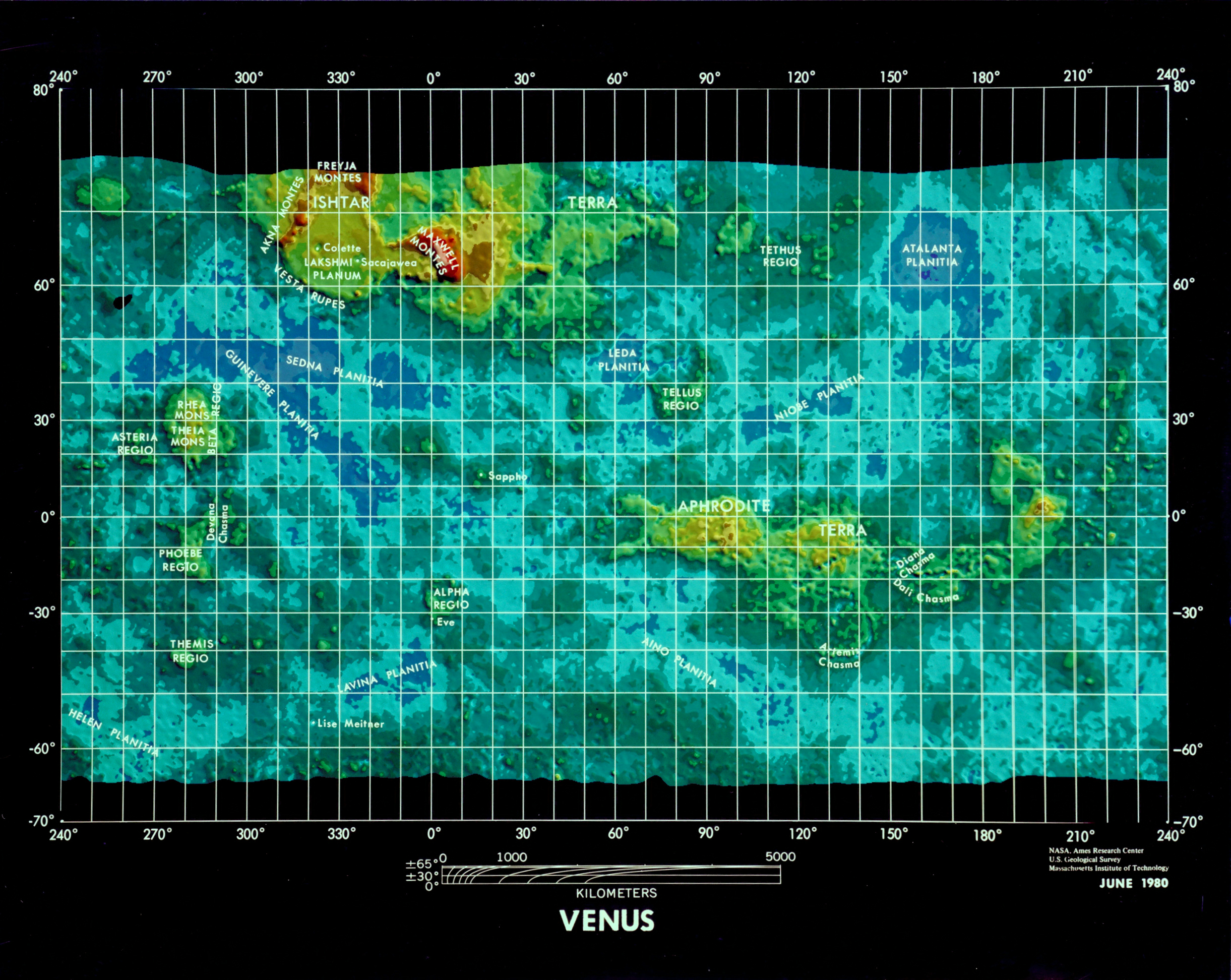
Map of Venus produced from Pioneer Venus Orbiter radar data

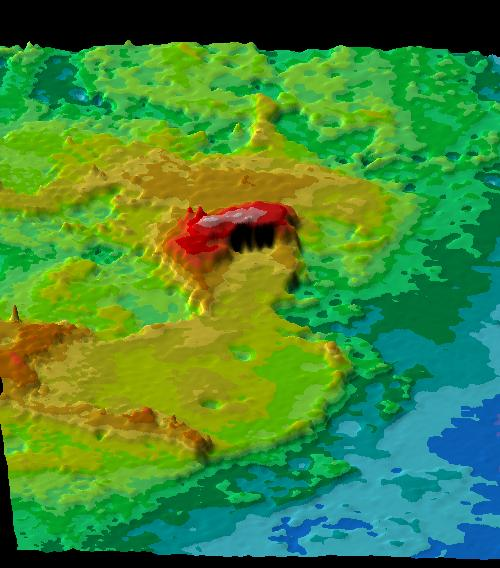
Perspective view of Ishtar Terra was derived from data obtained by the Pioneer Venus Orbiter's altimetry radar instrument

=== Observation of comets ===
From its orbit of Venus, the Pioneer Venus Orbiter was able to observe Halley's Comet when it was unobservable from Earth due to its proximity to the sun during February 1986. UV spectrometer observations monitored the loss of water from the comet's nucleus at perihelion on February 9.

The extended mission allowed the spacecraft controllers to make several comet observations that were never part of the original mission objectives. The tilt of the spacecraft was altered during these comet observations so that the Ultraviolet Spectrometer (OUVS) could view the comets rather than Venus. Comets Encke (April 13–16, 1984), Giacobini-Zinner (September 8–15, 1985), Halley (December 27, 1985 - March 9, 1986), Wilson (March 13 - May 2, 1987), NTT (April 8, 1987), and McNaught (November 19–24, 1987) were all observed in this way.

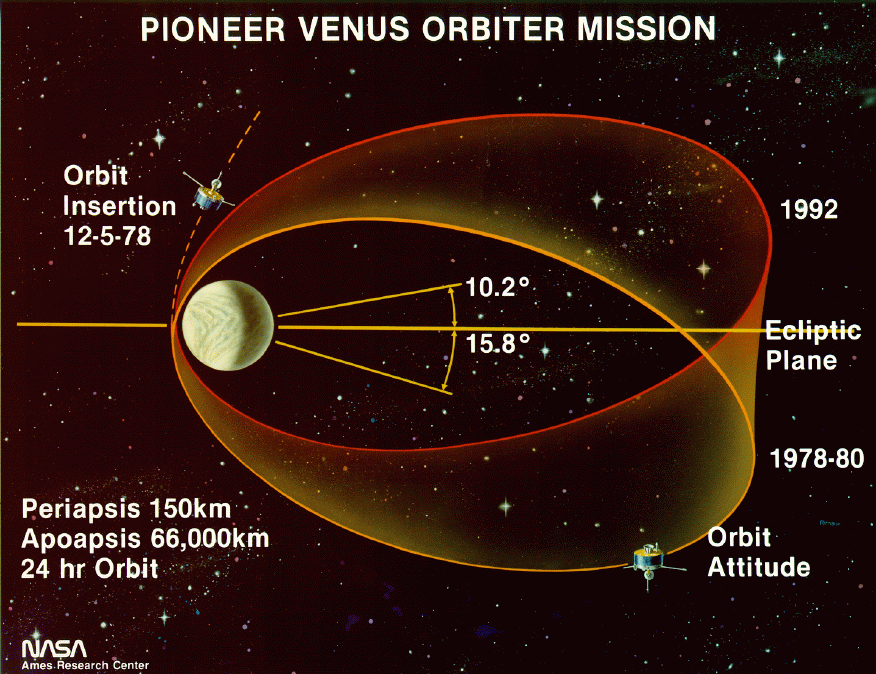
Orbit attitude of Pioneer Venus Orbiter between 1978–1980 and 1992

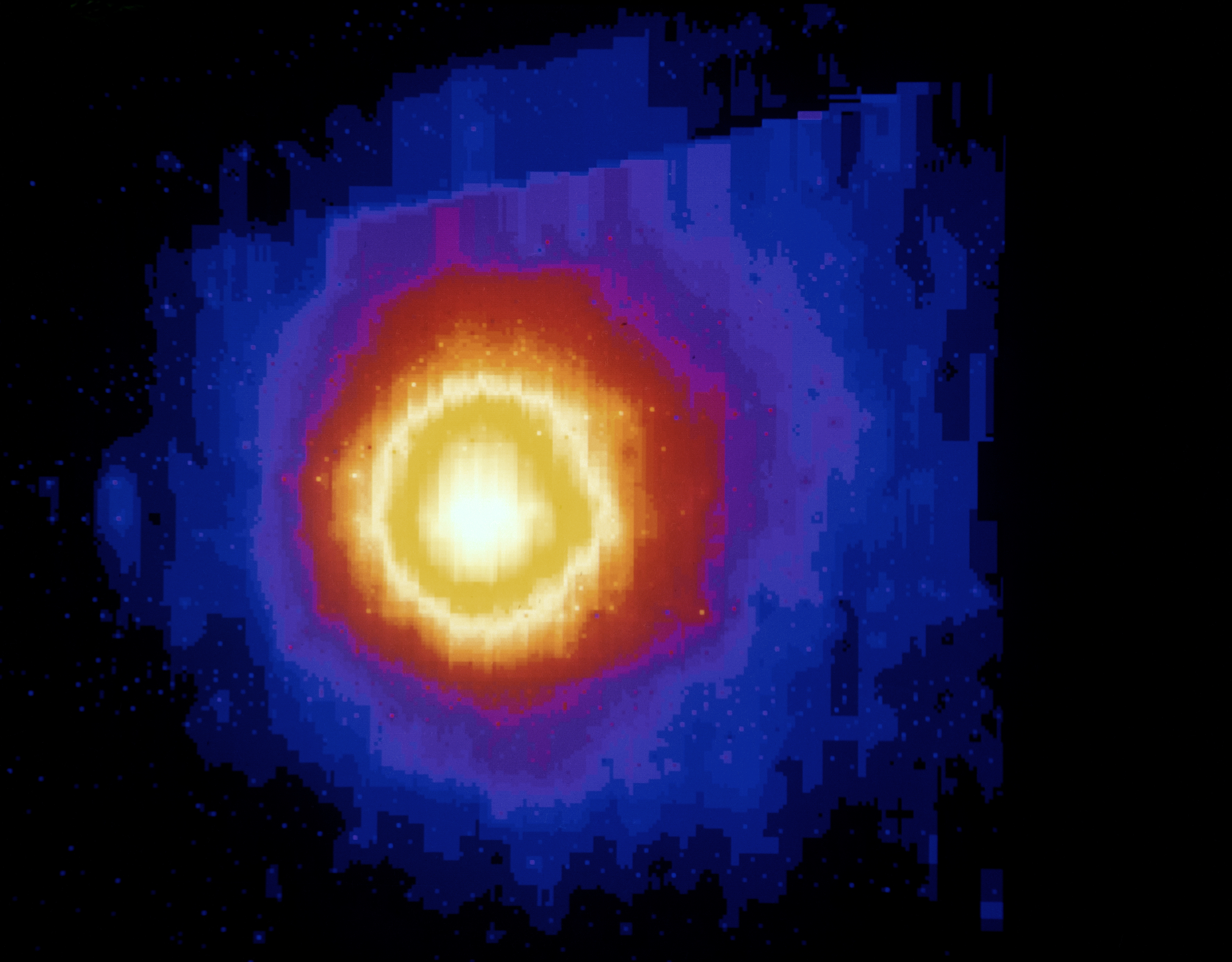
Comet Halley, UV Hydrogen emission (reddish circular band) by Pioneer Venus Orbiter

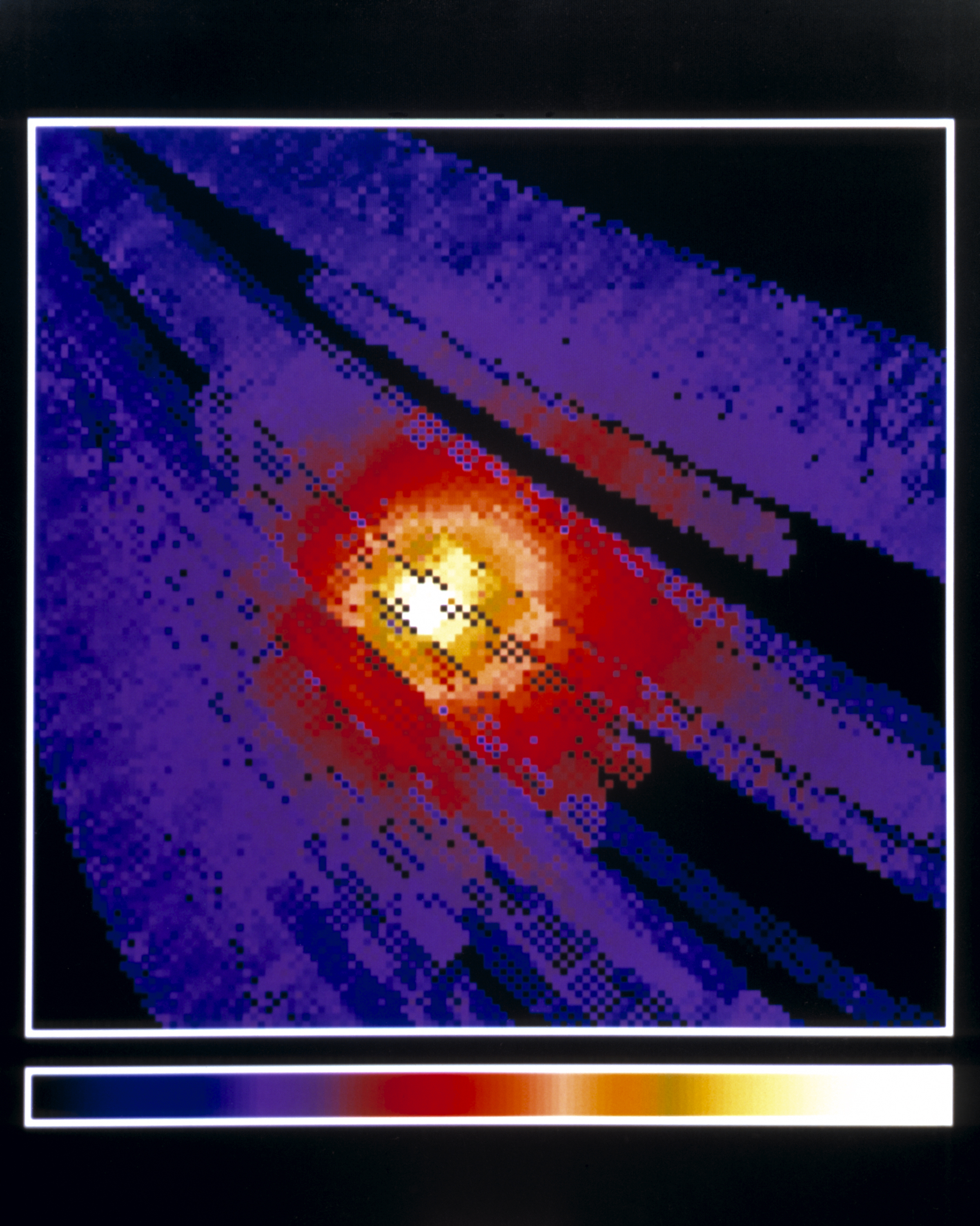
Comet Halley by Pioneer Venus Orbiter on February 11, 1986

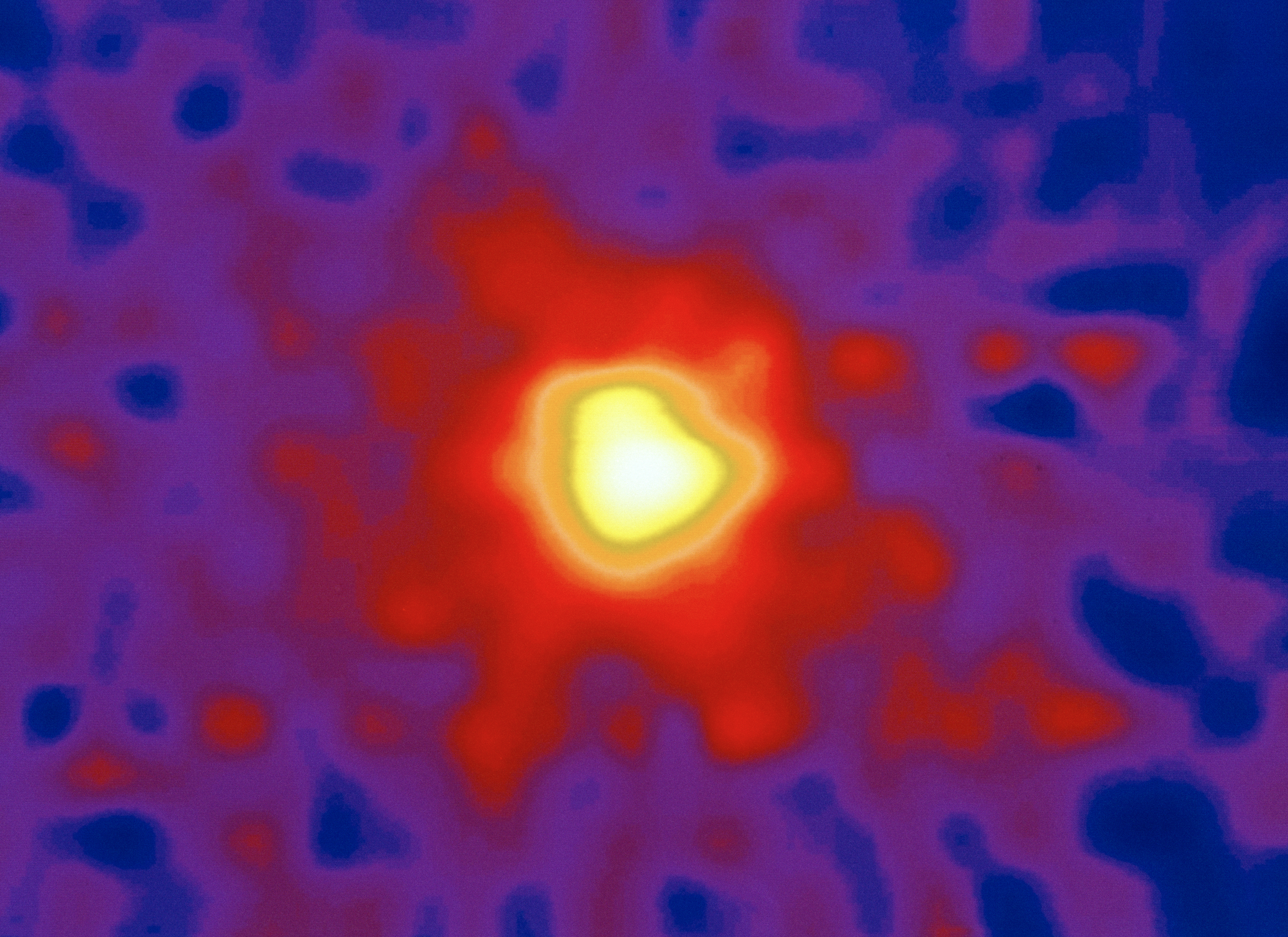
Comet Wilson by Pioneer Venus Orbiter

== See also ==
- Pioneer Venus Multiprobe
- List of missions to Venus
- Timeline of artificial satellites and space probes
