= Fairfax, Iowa =

- City
- Location of Fairfax, Iowa
- Coordinates: 41°55′39″N 91°46′43″W
- Country: United States
- State: Iowa
- County: Linn

Area
  - Total: 3.03 sq mi (7.85 km^{2})
  - Land: 3.00 sq mi (7.77 km^{2})
  - Water: 0.031 sq mi (0.08 km^{2})
- Elevation: 758 ft (231 m)

Population (2020)
  - Total: 2,828
  - Density: 942.9/sq mi (364.05/km^{2})
- Time zone: UTC-6 (Central (CST))
  - Summer (DST): UTC-5 (CDT)
- ZIP code: 52228
- Area code: 319
- FIPS code: 19-26400
- GNIS feature ID: 2394730
- Website: www.cityoffairfax.org

Fairfax is a city in Linn County, Iowa, United States. The population was 2,828 at the time of the 2020 census. It is part of the Cedar Rapids Metropolitan Statistical Area.

== History ==
Fairfax was laid out in 1863 when the railroad was extended to that point. It was named after Fairfax County, Virginia.

== Geography ==
Fairfax is located along U.S. Route 151, approximately 7 miles (11 km) southwest of downtown Cedar Rapids.

According to the United States Census Bureau, the city has a total area of 1.96 square miles (5.08 km^{2}), of which 1.94 square miles (5.02 km^{2}) is land and 0.02 square miles (0.05 km^{2}) is water.

== Demographics ==
Historical populations
Year	Pop.	±%
1940	262	—
1950	335	+27.9%
1960	528	+57.6%
1970	635	+20.3%
1980	683	+7.6%
1990	780	+14.2%
2000	889	+14.0%
2010	2,123	+138.8%
2020	2,828	+33.2%
Source:"U.S. Census website". United States Census Bureau. and Iowa Data Center; Source: U.S. Decennial Census

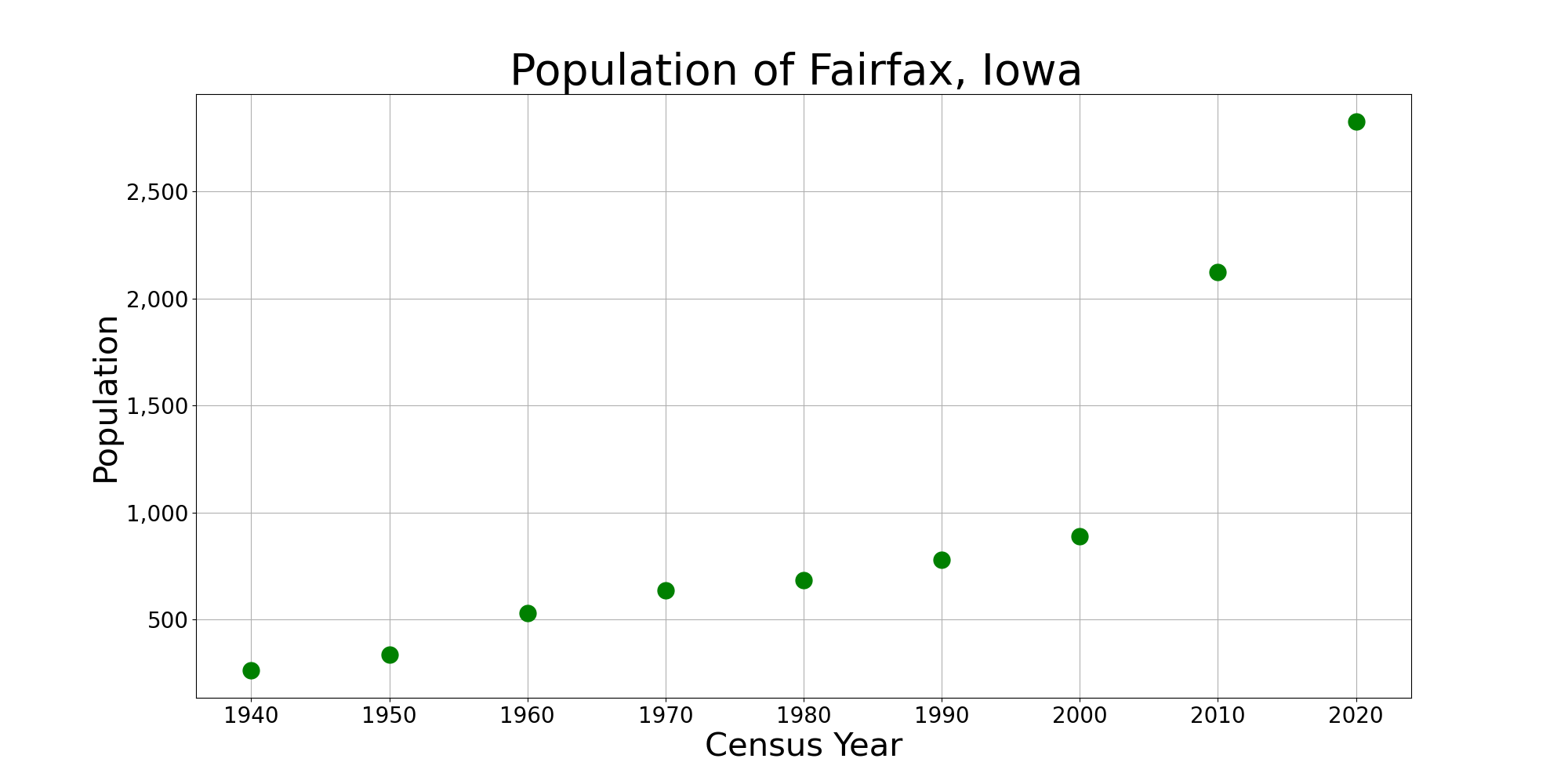
The population of Fairfax, Iowa from US census data

=== 2020 census ===
As of the 2020 census, Fairfax had a population of 2,828. The population density was 942.9 inhabitants per square mile (364.0/km^{2}), and the housing-unit density was 375.8 per square mile (145.1/km^{2}).

The median age was 41.1 years. 25.7% of residents were under the age of 18, and 16.5% were 65 years of age or older. 27.5% of residents were under the age of 20; 4.3% were between the ages of 20 and 24; 22.7% were from 25 to 44; and 29.0% were from 45 to 64. The gender makeup of the city was 49.1% male and 50.9% female. For every 100 females there were 96.5 males, and for every 100 females age 18 and over there were 93.5 males age 18 and over.

85.0% of residents lived in urban areas, while 15.0% lived in rural areas.

There were 1,083 households and 822 families in Fairfax, of which 36.3% had children under the age of 18 living in them. Of all households, 62.3% were married-couple households, 6.6% were cohabitating couple households, 10.9% were households with a male householder and no spouse or partner present, and 20.1% were households with a female householder and no spouse or partner present. About 24.1% of households were non-families, 18.5% of households were made up of individuals, and 8.3% had someone living alone who was 65 years of age or older. Of the 1,127 housing units, 3.9% were vacant. The homeowner vacancy rate was 0.9% and the rental vacancy rate was 11.6%.

Racial composition as of the 2020 census
Race	Number	Percent
White	2,608	92.2%
Black or African American	42	1.5%
American Indian and Alaska Native	5	0.2%
Asian	31	1.1%
Native Hawaiian and Other Pacific Islander	1	0.0%
Some other race	17	0.6%
Two or more races	124	4.4%
Hispanic or Latino (of any race)	77	2.7%

=== 2010 census ===
As of the census of 2010, there were 2,123 people, 782 households, and 608 families living in the city. The population density was 1,094.3 inhabitants per square mile (422.5/km^{2}). There were 803 housing units at an average density of 413.9 per square mile (159.8/km^{2}). The racial makeup of the city was 96.1% White, 1.2% African American, 0.2% Native American, 1.1% Asian, 0.5% from other races, and 0.8% from two or more races. Hispanic or Latino of any race were 1.4% of the population.

There were 782 households, of which 40.8% had children under the age of 18 living with them, 65.5% were married couples living together, 8.8% had a female householder with no husband present, 3.5% had a male householder with no wife present, and 22.3% were non-families. 18.2% of all households were made up of individuals, and 6% had someone living alone who was 65 years of age or older. The average household size was 2.71 and the average family size was 3.07.

The median age in the city was 36.6 years. 28.9% of residents were under the age of 18; 6.2% were between the ages of 18 and 24; 29.1% were from 25 to 44; 25.9% were from 45 to 64; and 9.8% were 65 years of age or older. The gender makeup of the city was 49.2% male and 50.8% female.

=== 2000 census ===
As of the census of 2000, there were 889 people, 327 households, and 263 families living in the city. The population density was 652.7 inhabitants per square mile (252.0/km^{2}). There were 336 housing units at an average density of 246.7 per square mile (95.3/km^{2}). The racial makeup of the city was 96.63% White, 0.90% African American, 0.45% Asian, 0.67% from other races, and 1.35% from two or more races. Hispanic or Latino of any race were 1.80% of the population.

There were 327 households, out of which 37.9% had children under the age of 18 living with them, 65.7% were married couples living together, 10.4% had a female householder with no husband present, and 19.3% were non-families. 17.7% of all households were made up of individuals, and 7.6% had someone living alone who was 65 years of age or older. The average household size was 2.72 and the average family size was 3.05.

28.9% are under the age of 18, 6.6% from 18 to 24, 28.1% from 25 to 44, 22.9% from 45 to 64, and 13.4% who were 65 years of age or older. The median age was 37 years. For every 100 females, there were 99.3 males. For every 100 females age 18 and over, there were 96.9 males.

The median income for a household in the city was $57,850, and the median income for a family was $59,348. Males had a median income of $41,932 versus $29,643 for females. The per capita income for the city was $19,583. About 3.0% of families and 2.9% of the population were below the poverty line, including 2.6% of those under age 18 and 3.9% of those age 65 or over.

== Notable people ==
- Mattie Blaylock, common-law wife of Wyatt Earp
- Donald Gurnett, physicist
