= Plasma Wave Subsystem =

Instrument on board the Voyager space probes

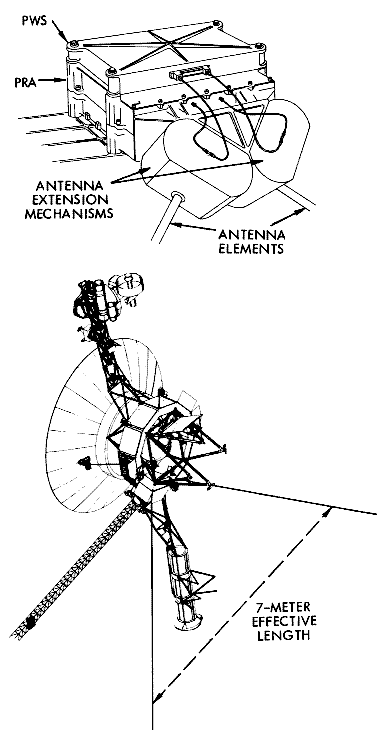
This diagram shows how the PWS and PRA share the Voyager antenna, and its overall location on the Voyager-type design

Here the data recorded by the PWS on Voyager 1 is converted to audio

Plasma Wave Subsystem (sometimes called Plasma Wave System), abbreviated PWS, is an instrument that is on board the Voyager 1 and Voyager 2 unmanned probes of the Voyager program. The device is 16 channel step frequency receiver and a low-frequency waveform receiver that can measure electron density. The PWS uses the two long antennae in a V-shape on the spacecraft, which are also used by another instrument on the spacecraft. The instrument recorded data about the Solar System's gas giants, and about the outer reaches of the Heliosphere, and beyond. In the 2010s, the PWS was used to play the "sounds of interstellar space" as the spacecraft can sample the local interstellar medium after they departed the Sun's heliosphere. The heliosphere is a region essentially under the influence of the Sun's solar wind, rather than the local interstellar environment, and is another way of understanding the Solar System in comparison to the objects gravitationally bound (e.g in orbit) around Earth's Sun.

The PWS instrument plan was introduced in 1974 during the development of the Voyager program. It was hoped it would help increase understanding of wave particle interactions and record data on the magnetospheres of planets like Jupiter and Saturn. The instruments went on to record radio waves at Jupiter, Saturn, Uranus, and Neptune.

The PWS instrument is one of the instruments that is a part of the Voyager interstellar mission, and they have operated for several decades after their 1977 launch into the 2010s.

Frederick L. Scarf of TRW was the first PI (principal investigator). After Scarf's death in 1988, Donald Gurnett became the PI.

== Specifications ==
List:

- Mass: 1.4 kg (3.08 pounds)
- Average electrical power consumption: 1.3 watts
- Average data rate: 0.032 kbit/s
- Frequency range 10 Hz to 56 kHz
- PWS/PRA Antenna:
  - Length of antenna: 10 meters (10.936 yards)
  - Number of antenna: 2
  - Angle between antenna: 90 degrees

== PWS and PRS ==
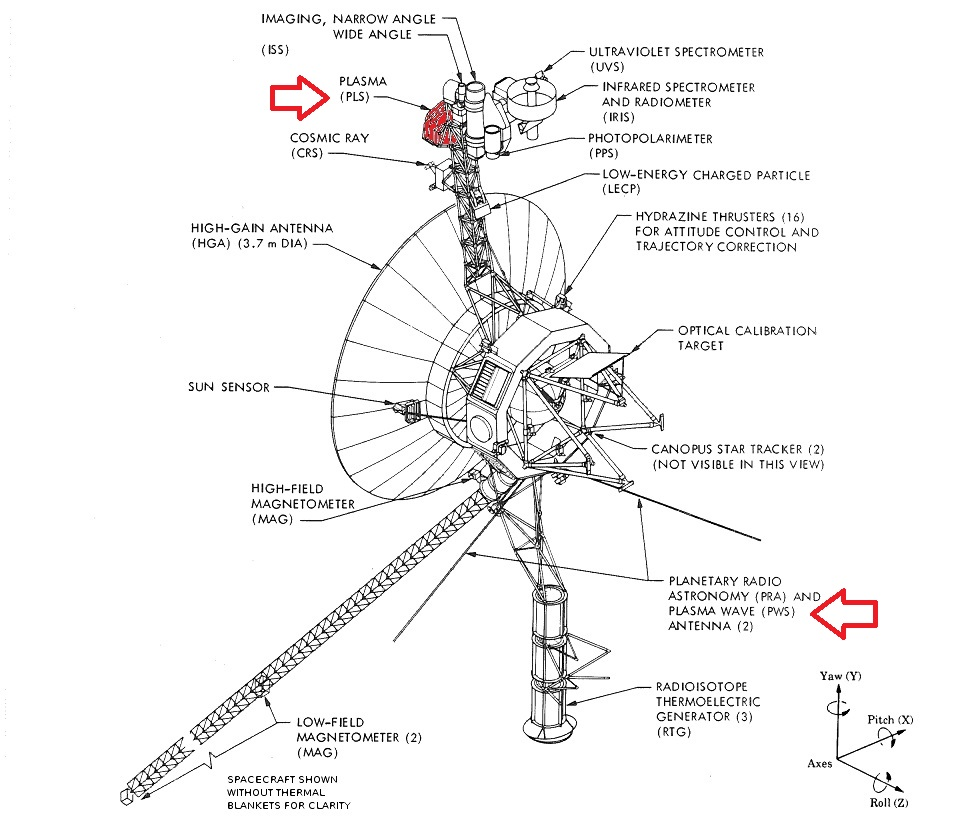
PLS, another Plasma instrument, and PWS antenna are noted in this diagram. Note that the antenna are truncated in this diagram and are much longer than shown, extending out 10 meters. The PWS also needs electrical power to operate, which comes from the RTG (also on this diagram).

== See also ==
- New Horizons (see plasma and high-energy particle spectrometer suite)
- Waves in plasmas
- Waves (Juno) (Spacecraft instrument aboard the Juno Jupiter orbiter of the 2010s)
