= Sun Rings =

Sun Rings is a Kronos Quartet project comprising pre-recorded sounds from space, images from space, music for string quartet and chorus composed by Terry Riley, and visuals by Willie Williams. It premiered 26 October 2002 at the Hancher Auditorium, University of Iowa.

The project started in 2000 when the NASA Art Program invited the Kronos Quartet to incorporate sounds, recorded over a period of 40 years by plasma wave receivers on board spacecraft, into music.
