= Christina Gurnett =

American neurologist

Christina A. Gurnett is the A. Ernest and Jane G. Stein Professor of Neurology, the director of the Division of Pediatric and Developmental Neurology at Washington University School of Medicine, and the chief of Neurology at St. Louis Children's Hospital.

== Early life and education ==
In 1991, Gurnett completed her B.S. in biology from University of Notre Dame. In 1998, she received her MD/PhD degrees specializing in Physiology and Biophysics from the University of Iowa. She stayed at Iowa for her residency in pediatrics, before moving to St. Louis Children's Hospital for fellowships in pediatric neurology (completed in 2003) and pediatric epilepsy (2004).

== Awards ==
- The Marfan Foundation’s 2017 Distinguished Research Award at the Foundation’s Heartworks St. Louis
