= Donald Gurnett =

American physicist (1940–2022)

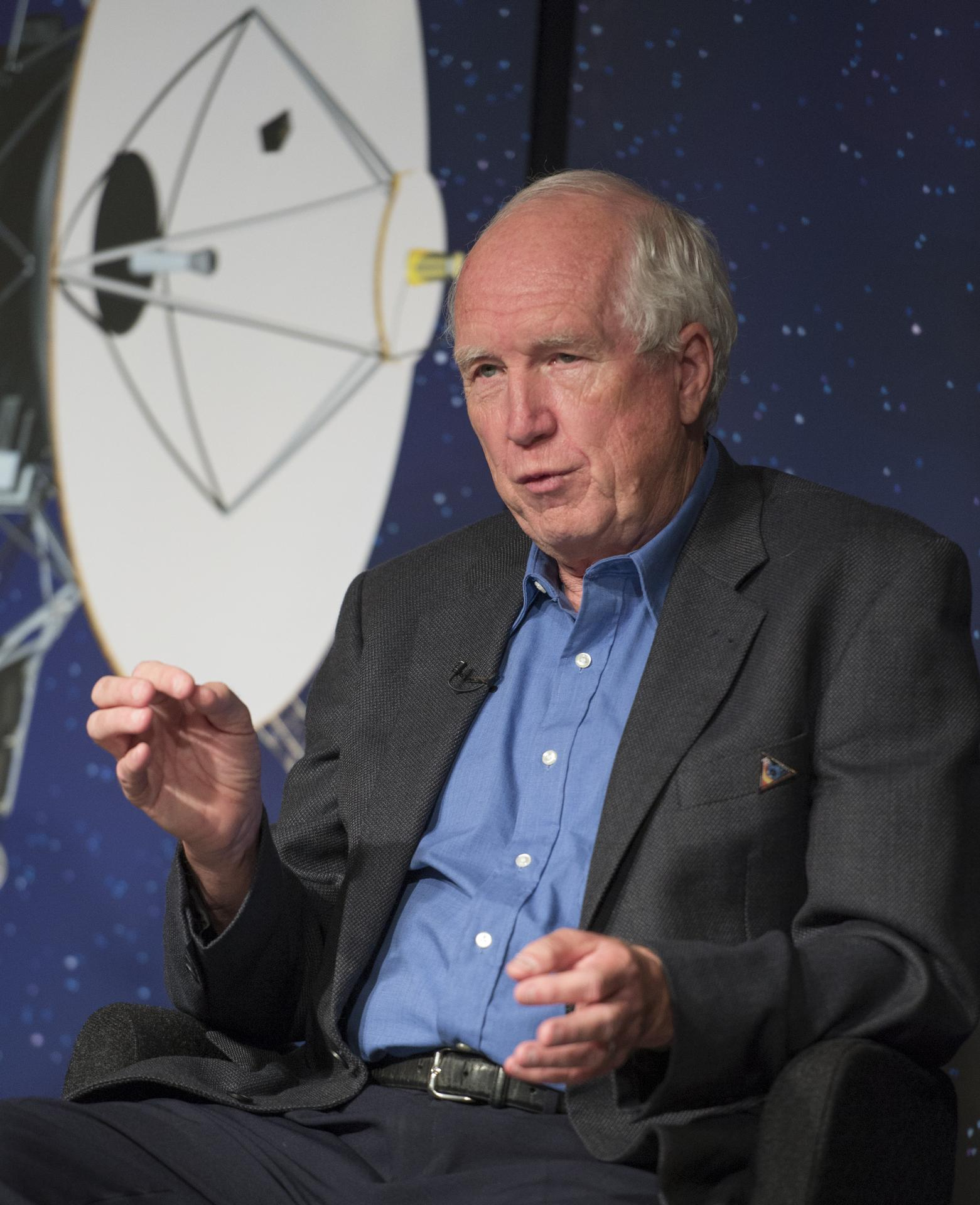
- Gurnett in 2013
- Born: April 11, 1940; Fairfax, Iowa
- Died: January 13, 2022 (aged 81); Iowa City, Iowa
- Known for: Plasma wave instrument
- Spouse: Marie Gurnett
- Children: Suzanne Gurnett; Christina Gurnett
- Scientific career
- Fields: Physics

Donald Alfred Gurnett (April 11, 1940 – January 13, 2022) was an American physicist and professor at the University of Iowa who specialized in plasma physics.

== Early life and education ==
Gurnett grew up in Fairfax, Iowa. In his spare time, he built and flew model airplanes with a club at the airport in Cedar Rapids. There, he met the German expatriate scientist Alexander Lippisch.

Gurnett received his bachelor's degree in electrical engineering from the University of Iowa in 1962, and then his master's degree in physics in 1963 and his doctorate in 1965.

== Career ==
Gurnett's research into space plasmas (and his involvement in the development of electronics and measuring devices for space missions) began while he was a student, and eventually led to early studies of plasma waves in the Earth's radiation belt (via low-frequency radio waves). From 1962, he was a NASA trainee at the University of Iowa and Stanford University (1964/65). He participated in the Injun satellites program, designed and built by researchers at the University of Iowa to observe various radiation and magnetic phenomena in the ionosphere and beyond. In 1965, he became an assistant professor, in 1968 an associate professor, and in 1972 a professor at the University of Iowa.

He was involved into 41 NASA missions, including Voyager mission to the outer planets, the Galileo mission to Jupiter, and the Cassini mission to Saturn. He was particularly concerned with the formation of the plasma waves observable in the radio spectrum in the plasmas of the radiation belts of planets with magnetic fields and wave-particle interactions in the plasmas, which are often easier to study in space than in the laboratory.

In late August 2012, the radio and plasma-wave instrument designed by Gurnett onboard Voyager 1 confirmed that it had crossed the heliopause.

== Awards and honors ==
In 1998, Gurnett became a member of the National Academy of Sciences. In 2004, he became a member of the American Academy of Arts and Sciences.

In 2006, he received the EGU Hannes Alfvén Medal. In 2014 he gave the Van Vleck Lecture. He was also awarded the Humboldt Prize, with which he was at the Max Planck Institute for Extraterrestrial Physics in Garching (1975/76). In 1989 he received the John Adam Fleming Medal from the American Geophysical Union and the Excellence in Plasma Physics Award from the APS and in 1978 the John Howard Dellinger Gold Medal from the International Union of Radio Science. In 1979/80 he was a visiting professor at UCLA.

== Personal life ==
He was married to his wife Marie. Together they had two daughters, Suzanne and Christina.

Gurnett died on January 13, 2022, at the age of 81.
