= Alfvén surface =

Boundary between solar corona and wind

NASA animation showing Parker Solar Probe passing through the Sun's outer atmosphere, its corona, in April 2021. The boundary at the edge of the corona is the Alfvén critical surface. Inside that surface (circle at left), plasma connects to the Sun by waves traveling back and forth to the surface. Beyond it (circle at right), the Sun's magnetic fields and gravity are too weak to contain the plasma and it becomes the solar wind, racing across the Solar System so fast that waves within the wind cannot make it back to the Sun.

The Alfvén surface is the boundary separating a star's corona from the stellar wind defined as where the coronal plasma's Alfvén speed and the large-scale stellar wind speed are equal. It is named after Hannes Alfvén, and is also called Alfvén critical surface, Alfvén point, or Alfvén radius. In 2018, the Parker Solar Probe became the first spacecraft to cross the Sun's Alfvén surface.

== Definition ==
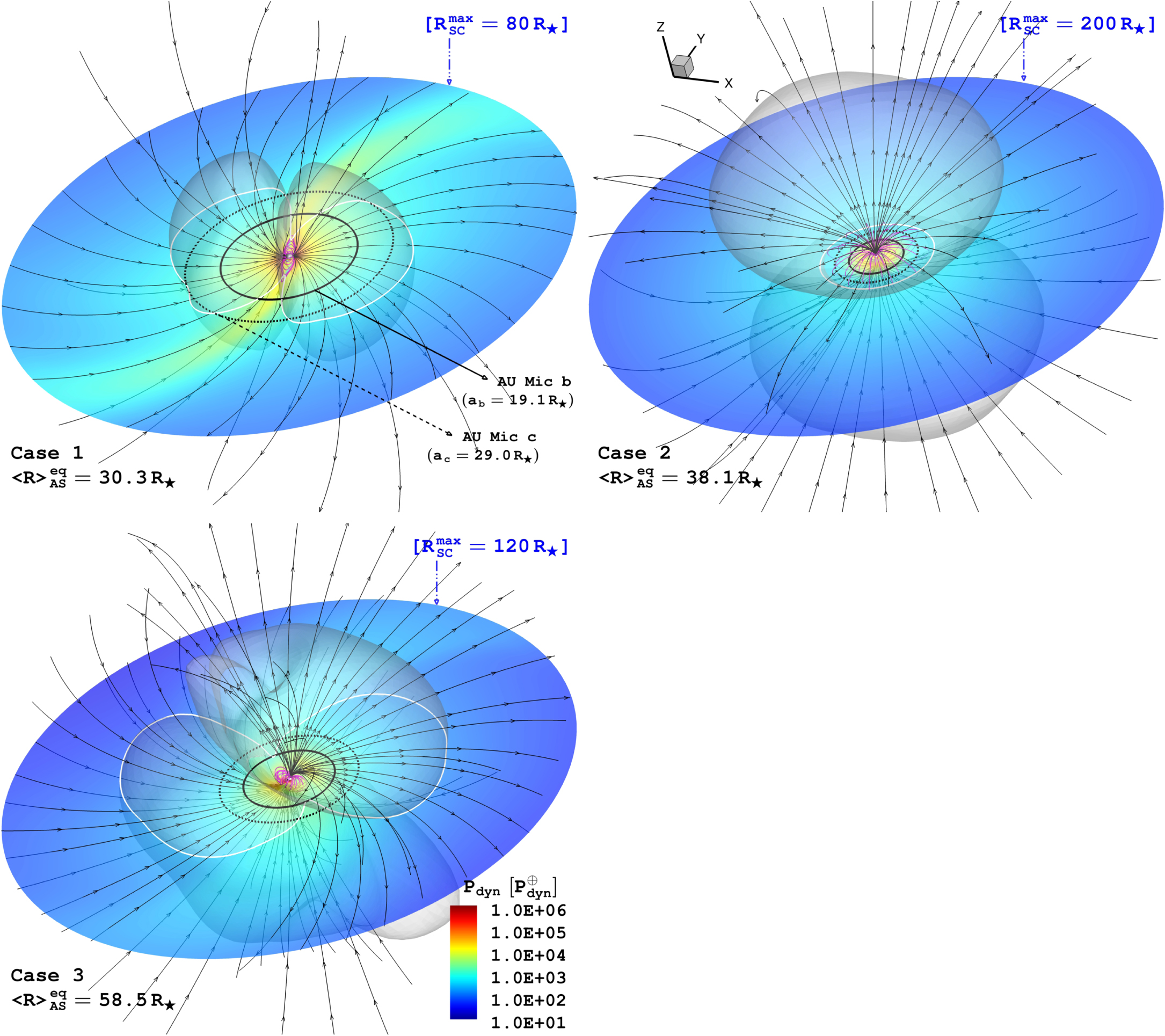
Simulated stellar wind environment for AU Microscopii. A translucent shade shows the resulting Alfvén surface of the stellar wind.

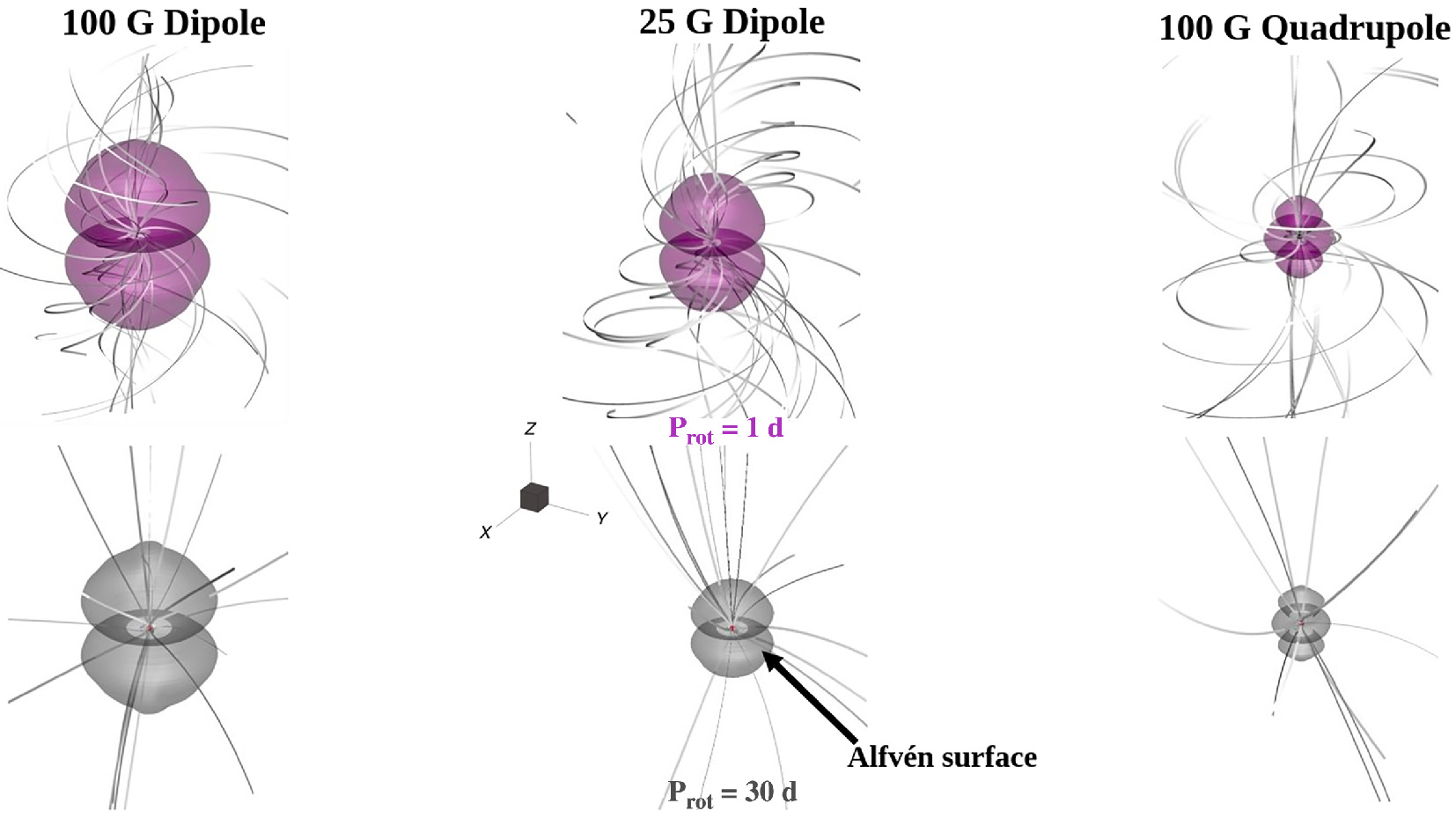
Effect of magnetic field strength and geometry on the Alfvén surface. The AS is highly affected by the change in the surface geometry.

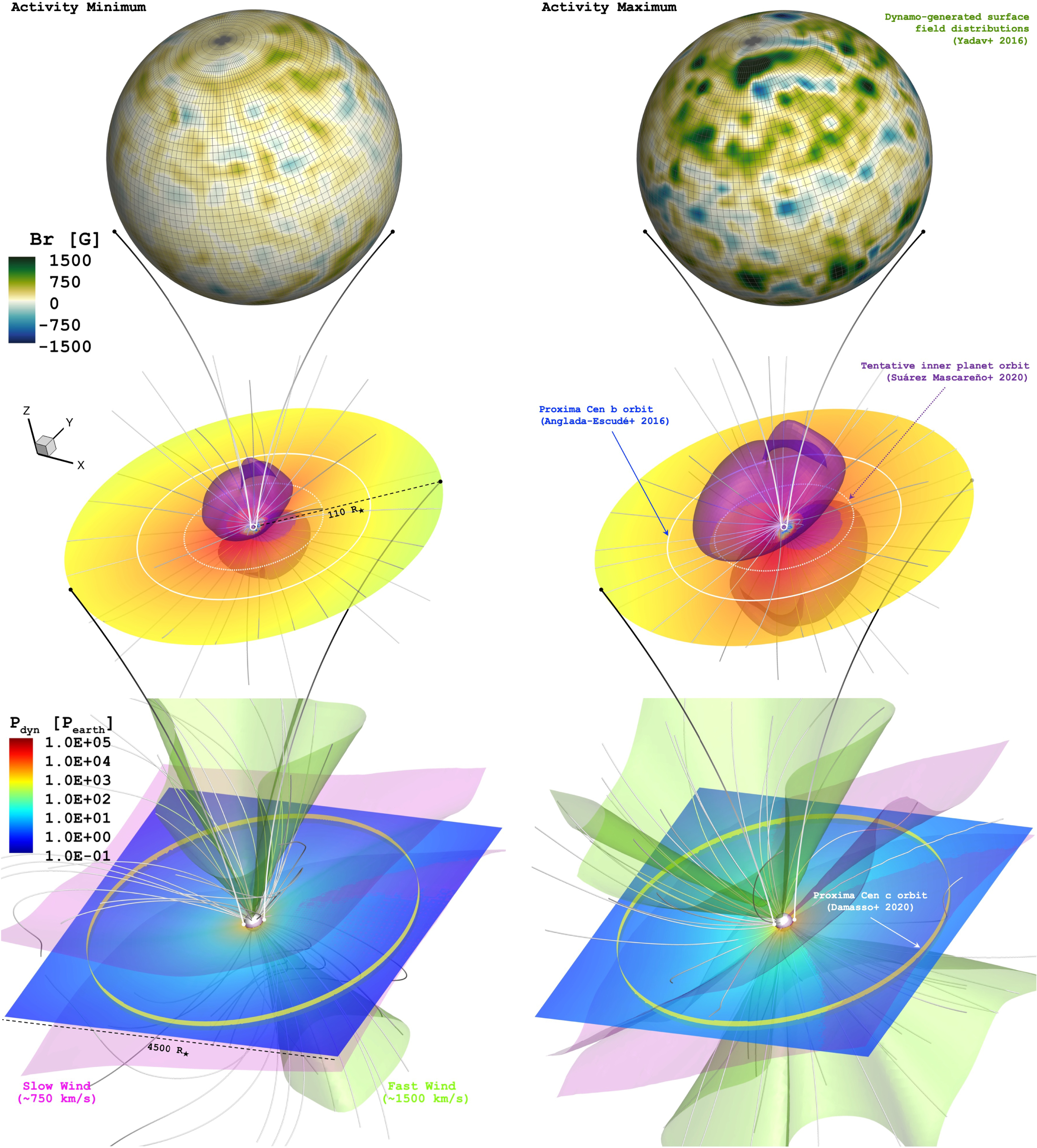
Simulated stellar wind environment for the Proxima Centauri system. The purple isosurface corresponds to the Alfvén surface of the stellar wind.

Stars do not have a solid surface. However, they have a superheated atmosphere, made of solar material bound to the star by gravity and magnetic forces. The stellar corona extends far beyond the solar surface, or photosphere, and is considered the outer boundary of the star. It marks the transition to the solar wind which moves through the planetary system. This limit is defined by the distance at which disturbances in the solar wind cannot propagate back to the solar surface. Those disturbances cannot propagate back towards a star if the outbound solar wind speed exceeds Mach one, the speed of 'sound' as defined for the solar wind. This distance forms an irregular 'surface' around a star called the Alfvén surface. It can also be described as a point where gravity and magnetic fields are too weak to contain heat and pressure that push the material away from a star. This is the point where solar atmosphere ends and where solar wind begins.

Adhikari, Zank, & Zhao (2019) define the Alfvén surface as:

the location at which the large-scale bulk solar wind speed $U$ and the Alfvén speed $V_{\text{A}}$ are equal, and thus it separates sub-Alfvénic coronal flow |$U$|≪|$V_{\text{A}}$| from super-Alfvénic solar wind flow |$U$|≫|$V_{\text{A}}$|

DeForest, Howard, & McComas (2014) define the Alfvén surface as:

a natural boundary that marks the causal disconnection of individual packets of plasma and magnetic flux from the Sun itself. The Alfvén surface is the locus where the radial motion of the accelerating solar wind passes the radial Alfvén speed, and therefore any displacement of material cannot carry information back down into the corona. It is thus the natural outer boundary of the solar corona, and the inner boundary of interplanetary space.

An Alfvén surface separates the sub- and super-Alfvénic regimes of the stellar wind, which influence the structure of any magnetosphere/ionosphere around an orbiting planet in the system. Characterization of the Alfvén surface can serve as an inner-boundary of the habitable zone of the star. An Alfvén surface can be found "nominally" at 10–30 star radii.

== Research ==
Researchers were unsure exactly where the Alfvén critical surface of the Sun lay. Based on remote images of the corona, estimates had put it somewhere between 10 and 20 solar radii from the surface of the Sun. On April 28, 2021, during its eighth flyby of the Sun, NASA's Parker Solar Probe (PSP) encountered the specific magnetic and particle conditions at 18.8 solar radii that indicated that it penetrated the Alfvén surface; the probe measured the solar wind plasma environment with its FIELDS and SWEAP instruments. This event was described by NASA as "touching the Sun". During the flyby, Parker Solar Probe passed into and out of the corona several times. This proved the predictions that the Alfvén critical surface is not shaped like a smooth ball, but has spikes and valleys that wrinkle its surface.

At 09:33 UT on 28 April 2021 Parker Solar Probe entered the magnetized atmosphere of the Sun 13 million kilometres (8.1 million miles) above the photosphere, crossing below the Alfvén critical surface for five hours into plasma in causal contact with the Sun with an Alfvén Mach number of 0.79 and magnetic pressure dominating both ion and electron pressure. Magnetic mapping suggests the region was a steady flow emerging on rapidly expanding coronal magnetic field lines lying above a pseudostreamer. The sub-Alfvénic nature of the flow may be due to suppressed magnetic reconnection at the base of the pseudostreamer, as evidenced by unusually low densities in this region and the magnetic mapping.

NASA's PUNCH mission will observe the Sun's Alfven surface "24/7 by measuring the motions of tiny blobs ("leaves in the wind") that flow down toward the Sun".
