= WISPR =

Instrument on the Parker Solar Probe

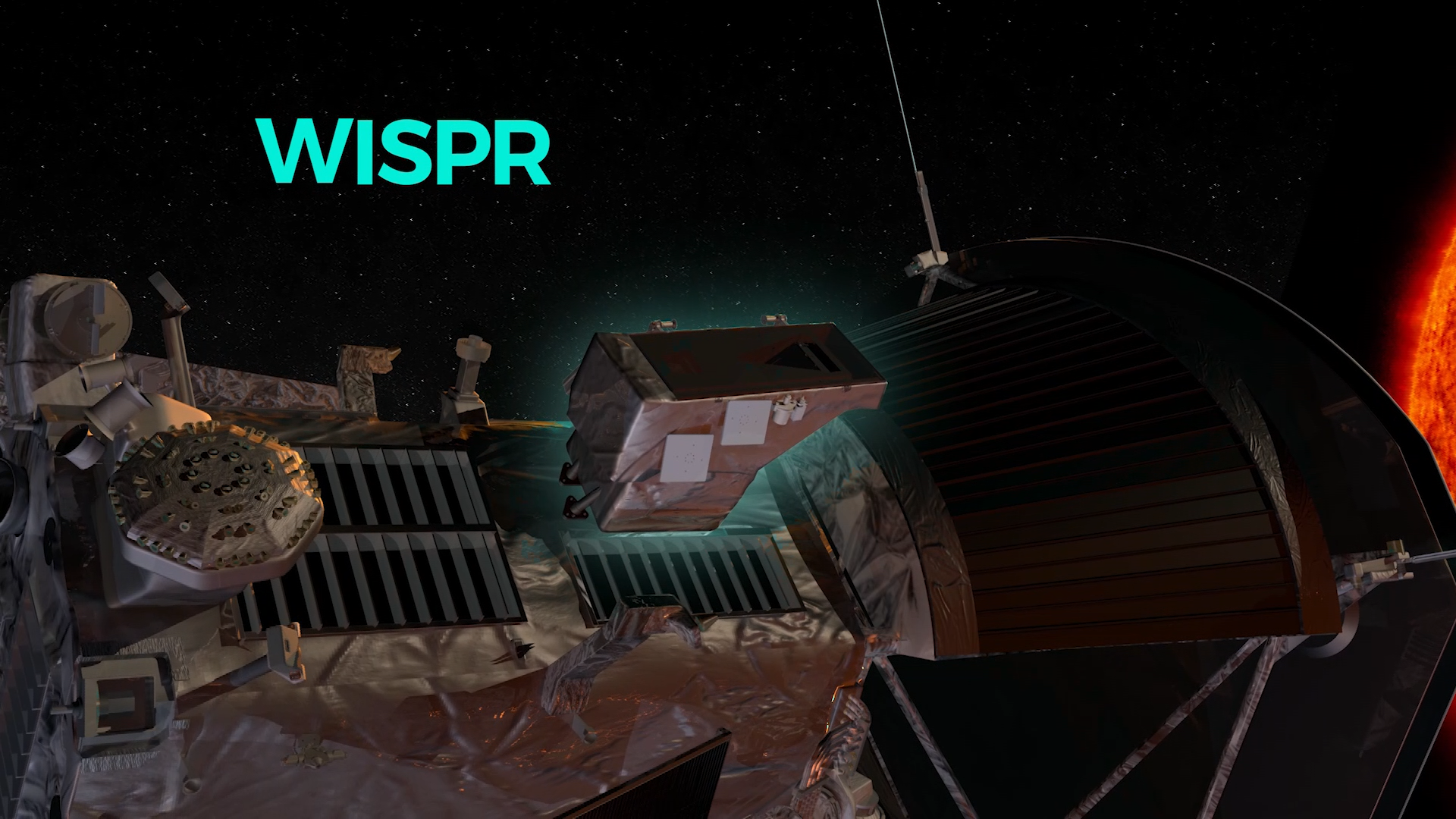
WISPR instrument location

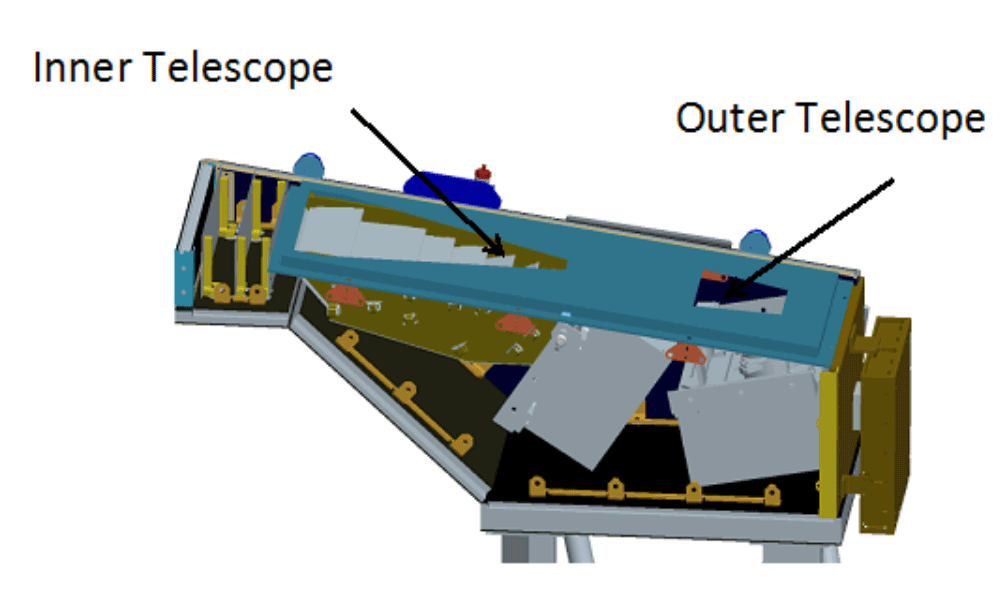
Diagram of WISPR

The Wide-Field Imager for Parker Solar Probe (WISPR) is an imaging instrument of the Parker Solar Probe mission to the Sun, launched in August 2018. Imaging targets include visible light images of the corona, solar wind, shocks, solar ejecta, etc. Development of WISPR was led by the U.S. Naval Research Laboratory. The Parker Solar Probe with WISPR on board was launched by a Delta IV Heavy on 12 August 2018 from Cape Canaveral, Florida. WISPR is intended to take advantage of the spacecraft's proximity to the Sun by taking coronagraph-style images of the solar corona and features like coronal streamers, plumes, and mass ejections. One of the goals is to better understand the structure of the solar corona near the Sun.

WISPR is designed to study the electron density and velocity structure of the corona. The instrument field of view is planned to extend from 13 to 108 degrees away from the Sun, and does not directly image the Sun; the area of interest is a very wide field extending away from the Sun.

WISPR includes two separate telescopes, each with SRI’s Active Pixel CMOS detectors that are radiation-hardened CMOS sensors with a resolution of 2,048×1,920 pixels. The CMOS sensors are an active pixel sensor type of detector. The two telescopes are designated WISPR-Inner (WISPR-I) and WISPR-Outer (WISPR-O), with WISPR-I observing at angles 13°–53° away from the Sun and WISPR-O viewing elongations of 50°–108°. Both telescopes observe at both visible and near-infrared wavelengths, with bandpass filters of 490–740 nm and 475–725 nm on WISPR-I and WISPR-O, respectively.

The WISPR first light image was published in September 2018. In December, a view of the corona including a coronal streamer was released.

In November 2018, a video of WIPSR recording solar wind during the spacecraft's first close pass to the Sun was released. One project scientist noted, "The data we’re seeing from Parker Solar Probe’s instruments is showing us details about solar structures and processes that we have never seen before."

== Development ==
The stray light and baffle for WISPR was modeled during development of the instrument. Two noted cases where stray material caused issue with space imaging includes the Infrared Telescope (IRT) flown on the Space Shuttle Spacelab-2 mission, in which a piece of mylar insulation broke loose and floated into the line-of-sight of the telescope corrupting data. This was on the STS-51-F in the year 1985. Another case was in the 2010s on the Gaia spacecraft for which some stray light was identified coming from fibers of the sunshield, protruding beyond the edges of the shield.

== Gallery ==
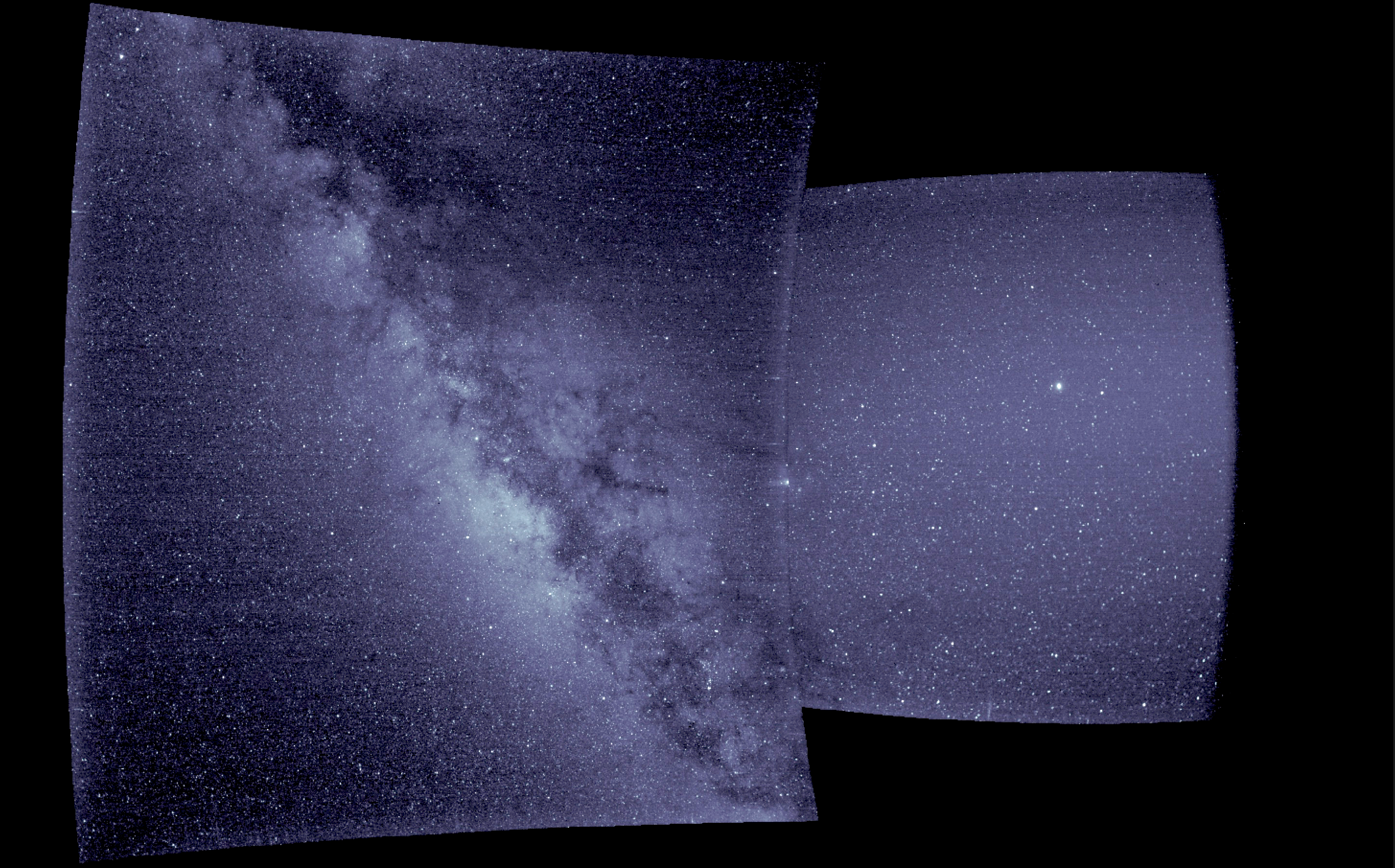
WISPR first light image. The right portion of the image is from WISPR's inner telescope, which is a 40-degree field of view and begins 58.5 degrees from the Sun's center. The left portion is from the outer telescope, which is a 58-degree field of view and ends about 160 degrees from the Sun.

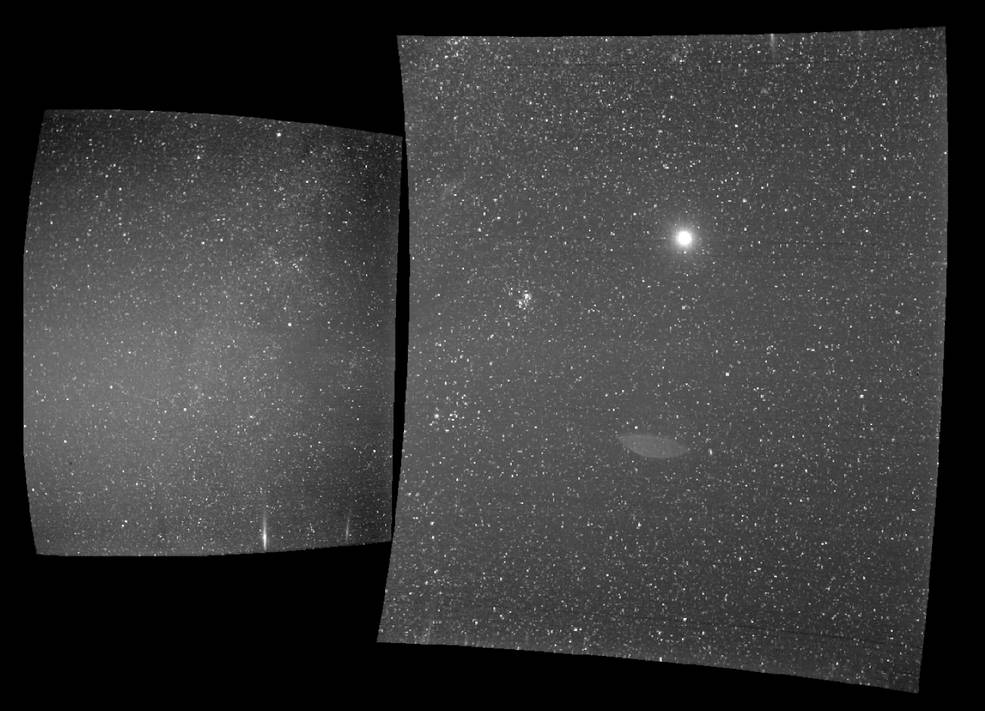
The view from the probe's WISPR instrument on Sept. 25, 2018, shows Earth, the bright sphere near the middle of the right-hand panel. The elongated mark toward the bottom of the panel is a lens reflection from the WISPR instrument

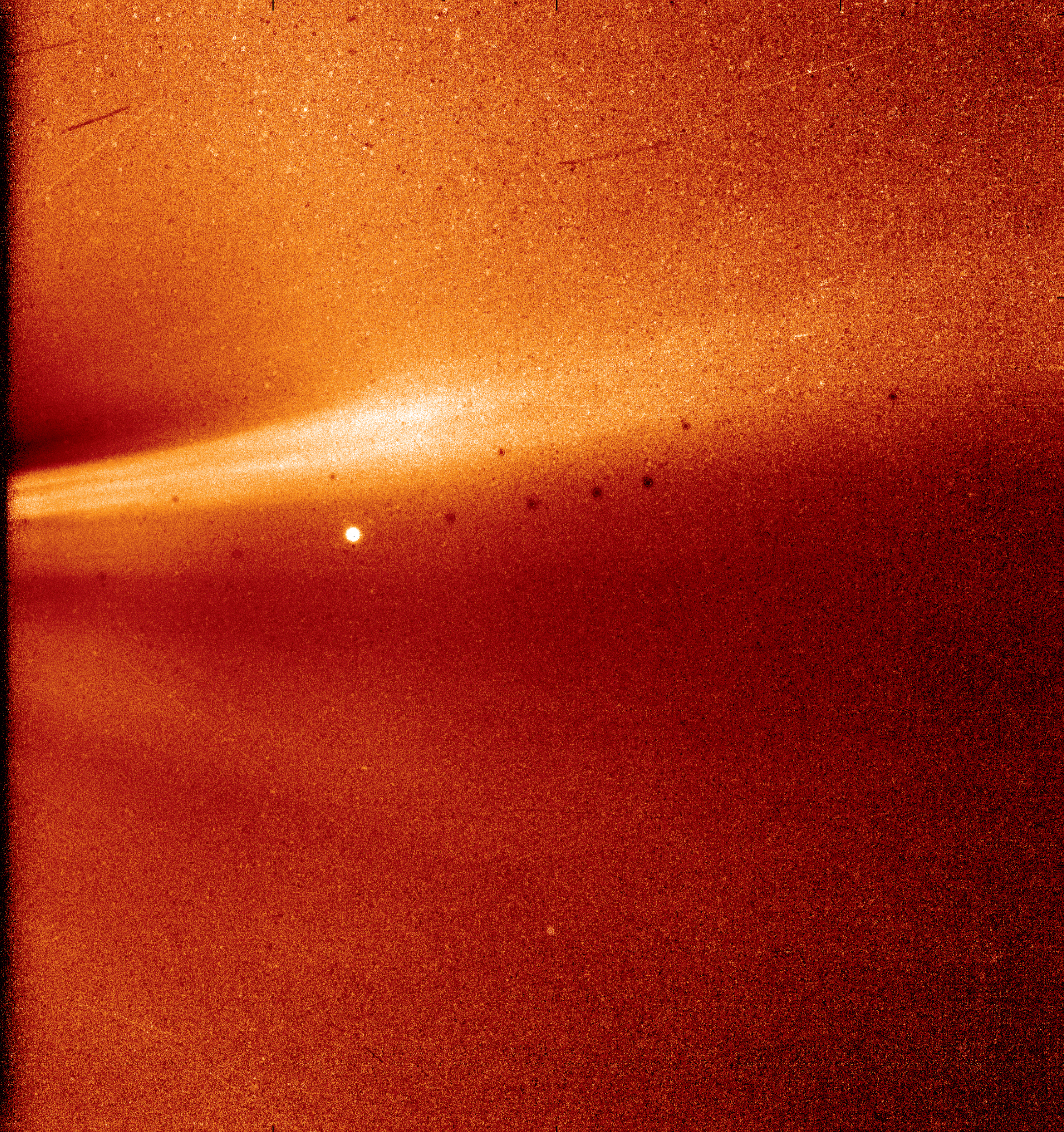
Photo from the WISPR shows a coronal streamer, seen over the east limb of the Sun on Nov. 8, 2018, at 1:12 a.m. EST. The fine structure of the streamer is very clear, with at least two rays visible. Parker Solar Probe was about 16.9 million miles from the Sun's surface when this image was taken. The bright object near the center of the image is Mercury, and the dark spots are a result of background correction.

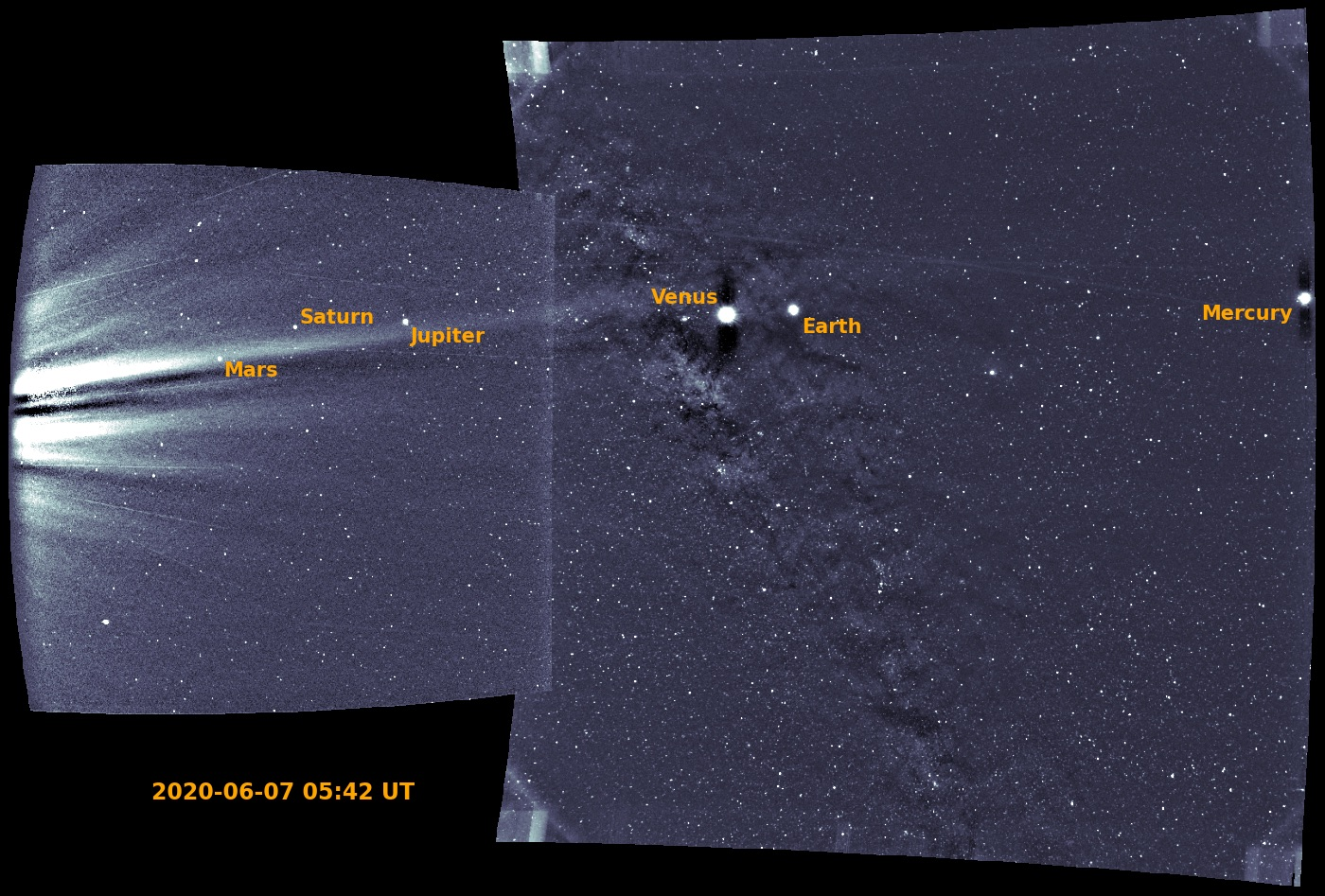
When Parker Solar Probe was making its closest approach to the Sun on June 7, 2020, WISPR captured the planets Mercury, Venus, Earth, Mars, Jupiter and Saturn in its field of view

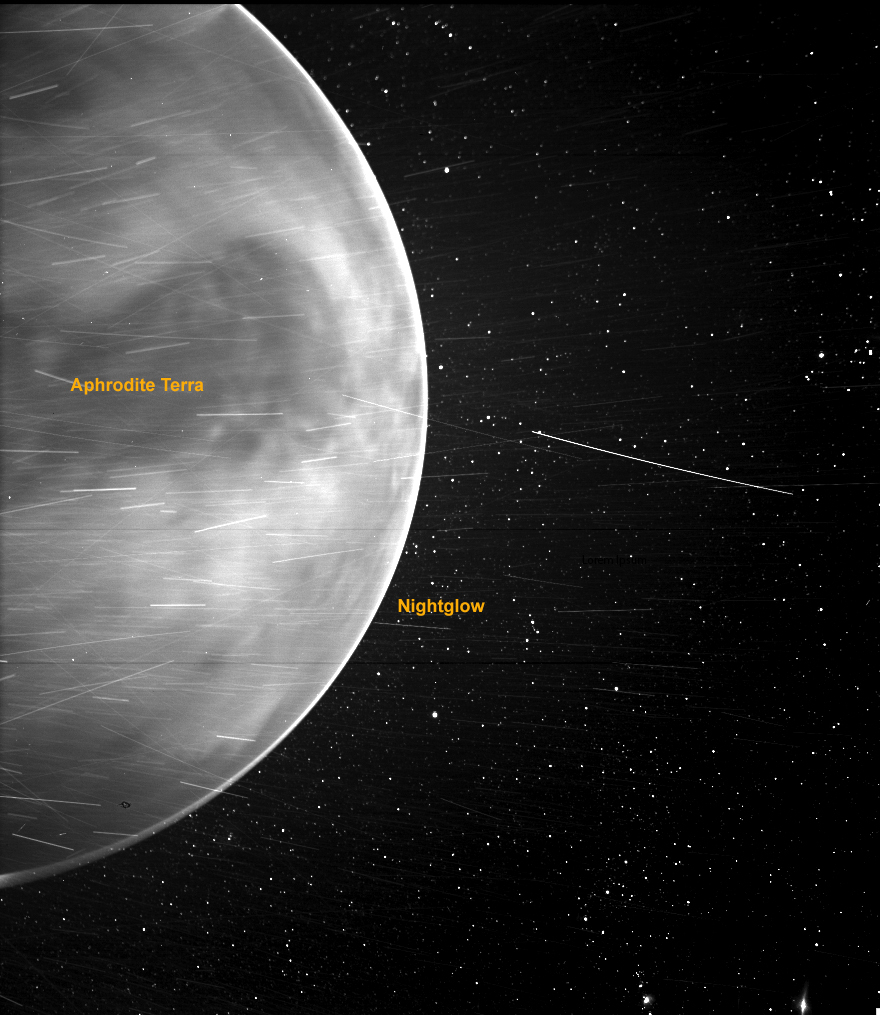
Photo taken by the probe during its second Venus flyby, July 2020

As Parker Solar Probe flew by Venus on its fourth flyby, its WISPR instrument captured these images, showing the nightside surface of the planet

As the probe passed through the Sun's corona in early 2021, it flew by structures called coronal streamers

== See also ==
- FIELDS
- IS☉IS
- SWEAP
