= Parker Solar Probe =

NASA probe of the Sun's outer corona

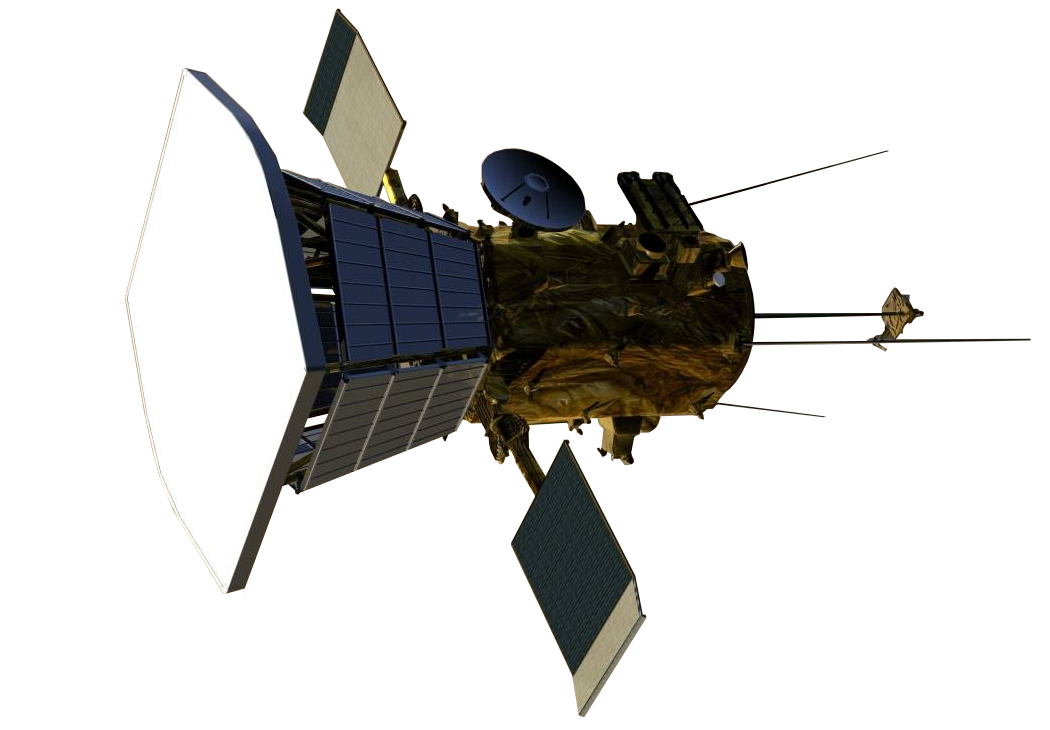
- Model of the Parker Solar Probe
- Names: Solar Probe (before 2002); Solar Probe Plus (2010–2017); Parker Solar Probe (since 2017)
- Mission type: Heliophysics
- Operator: NASA / Applied Physics Laboratory
- COSPAR ID: 2018-065A
- SATCAT no.: 43592
- Website: parkersolarprobe.jhuapl.edu
- Mission duration: 7 years, 11 including extension Elapsed: 8 years and 100 days

Spacecraft properties
- Manufacturer: Applied Physics Laboratory
- Launch mass: 685 kg (1,510 lb)
- Dry mass: 555 kg (1,224 lb)
- Payload mass: 50 kg (110 lb)
- Dimensions: 1 × 3 × 2.3 m (3.3 × 9.8 × 7.5 ft)
- Power: 343 W (at closest approach)

Start of mission
- Launch date: 12 August 2018, 07:31 UTC
- Rocket: Delta IV Heavy / Star 48BV
- Launch site: Cape Canaveral, SLC‑37
- Contractor: United Launch Alliance

Orbital parameters
- Reference system: Heliocentric orbit
- Semi-major axis: 0.388 AU (58.0 million km; 36.1 million mi)
- Perihelion altitude: 0.046 AU (6.9 million km; 4.3 million mi; 9.86 R_{☉}) (Note: Mission planning used a perihelion of 9.5 R_{☉} (6.6 million km; 4.1 million mi), or 8.5 R_{☉} (5.9 million km; 3.7 million mi) altitude above the surface, but later documents all say 9.86 R_{☉}. The exact value was not finalized until the seventh Venus gravity assist in 2024. Mission planners might decide to alter it slightly before then.)
- Aphelion altitude: 0.73 AU (109 million km; 68 million mi)
- Inclination: 3.4°
- Period: 88 days

Transponders
- Band: K_{a}-band, X-band
Instruments
- SWEAP: Solar Wind Electrons Alphas and Protons Investigation
- SPC: Solar Probe Cup
- SPAN: Solar Probe Analyzers
- WISPR: Wide-field Imager for Solar Probe
- FIELDS: Electromagnetic Fields Investigation
- IS☉IS: Integrated Science Investigation of the Sun Energetic Particle Instruments
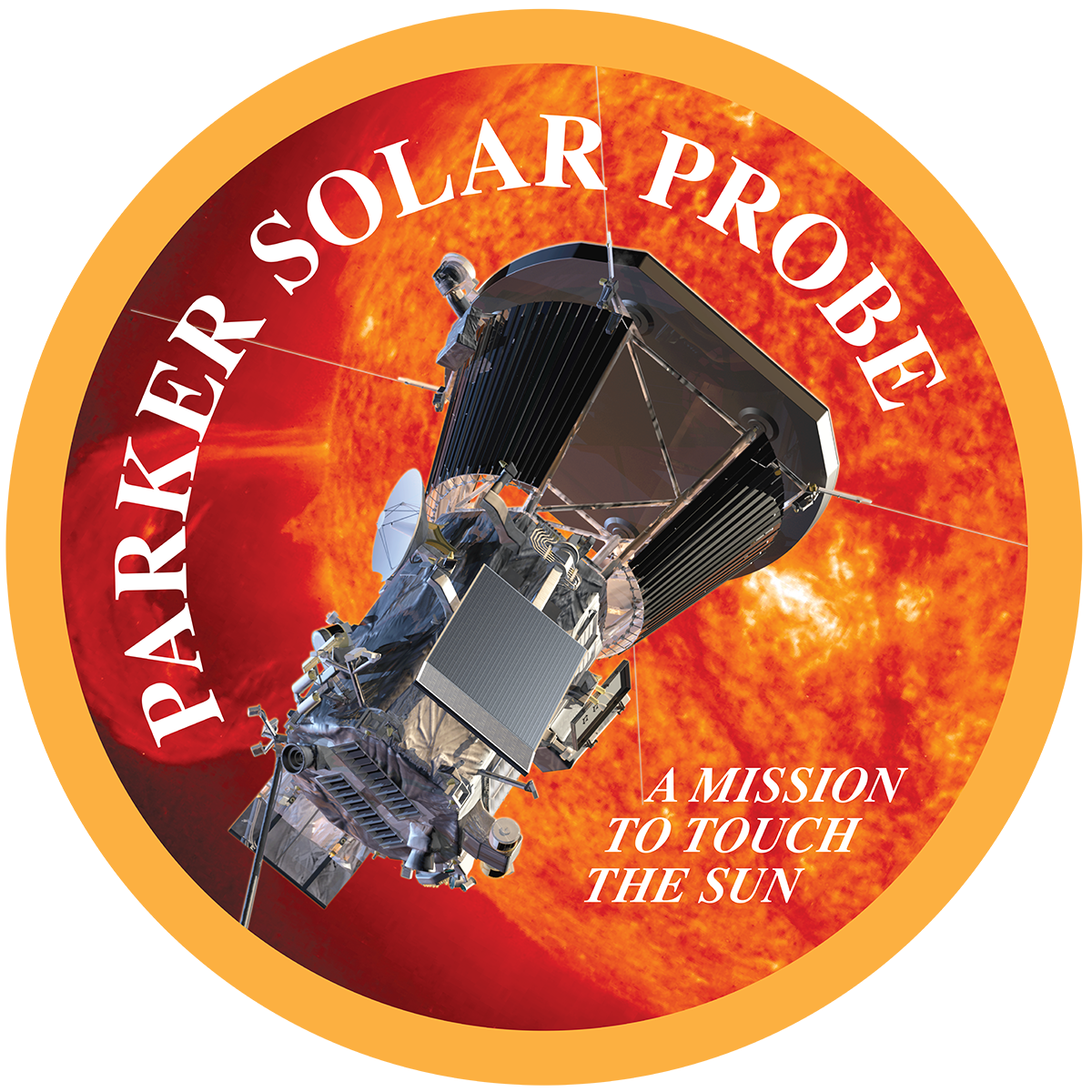
- Mission insignia Large Strategic Science Missions; Heliophysics Division Living With a Star program

The Parker Solar Probe (PSP; previously Solar Probe, Solar Probe Plus or Solar Probe+) is a NASA space probe launched in 2018 to make observations of the Sun's outer corona.

It used repeated gravity assists from Venus to develop an eccentric orbit, approaching within 9.86 solar radii (6.9 million km or 4.3 million miles) from the center of the Sun. At its closest approach in 2024, its speed relative to the Sun was 690,000 km/h (430,000 mph) or 191 km/s (118.7 mi/s), which is 0.064% the speed of light. It is the fastest object ever built on Earth.

The project was announced in the 2009 budget year. Johns Hopkins University Applied Physics Laboratory designed and built the spacecraft, which was launched on August 12, 2018. It became the first NASA spacecraft named after a living person, honoring the physicist Eugene Newman Parker, professor emeritus at the University of Chicago.

On October 29, 2018, at about 18:04 UTC, the spacecraft became the closest ever artificial object to the Sun. The previous record, 42.73 million kilometers (26.55 million miles) from the Sun's surface, was set by the Helios 2 spacecraft in April 1976. At its perihelion on September 27, 2023, the PSP's closest approach was 7.26 million kilometers (4.51 million miles), reaching this distance again on March 29, 2024.

On December 24, 2024, at 11:53 UTC, PSP made its closest approach to the Sun, coming to a distance of 6.16 million km (3.83 million miles) from the surface. Its beacon signal was received on December 26, showing that it had survived the passage through the corona. Detailed telemetry was received January 1, 2025.

In 2025, the teams from NASA, Johns Hopkins, and partners were awarded the 2024 Collier Trophy for their achievements. In 2026, the PSP's mission was extended to 2029.

== History ==
The Parker Solar Probe concept originates in the 1958 report by the Fields and Particles Group, Committee 8 of the National Academy of Sciences' Space Science Board, which proposed several space missions including "a solar probe to pass inside the orbit of Mercury to study the particles and fields in the vicinity of the Sun".

Studies in the 1970s and 1980s reaffirmed its importance, but it was always postponed due to cost. A cost-reduced Solar Orbiter mission was studied in the 1990s, and a more capable Solar Probe mission served as one of the centerpieces of the Outer Planet/Solar Probe (OPSP) program formulated by NASA in the late 1990s. The first three missions of the program were planned to be: the Solar Orbiter, the Pluto and Kuiper belt reconnaissance Pluto Kuiper Express mission, and the Europa Orbiter astrobiology mission focused on Europa.

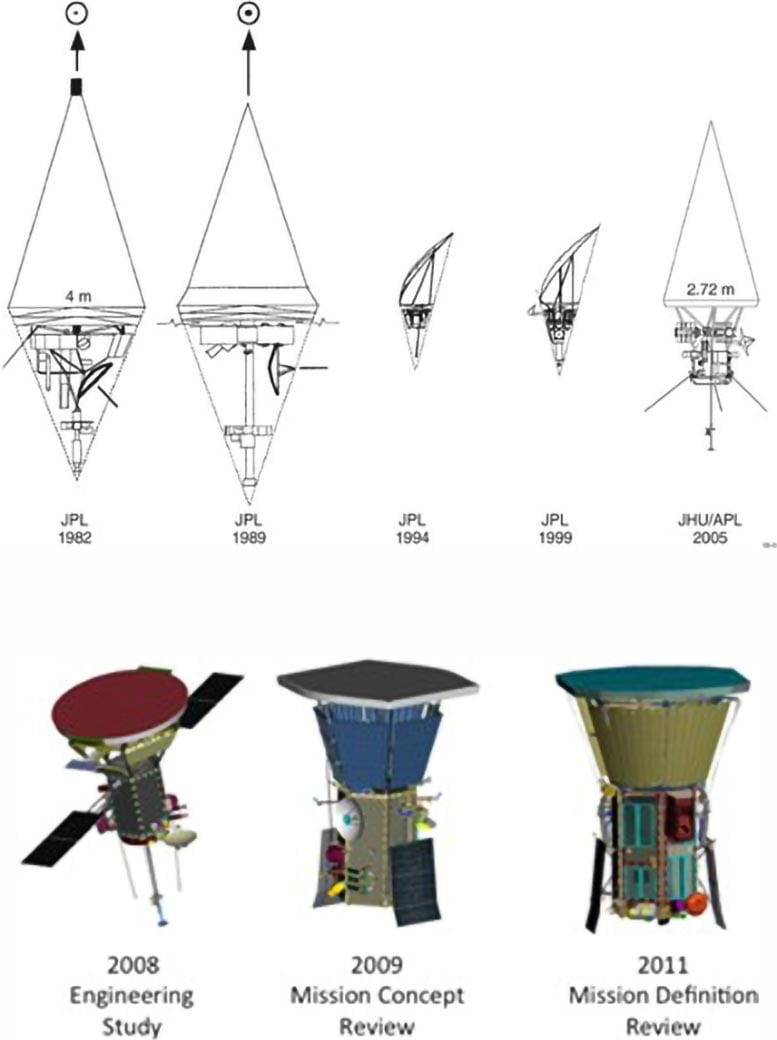
Evolution of PSP design

The original Solar Probe design used a gravity assist from Jupiter to enter a polar orbit which dropped almost directly toward the Sun. While this explored the important solar poles and came even closer to the surface (3 R_{☉}, a perihelion of 4 R_{☉}), the extreme variation in solar irradiance made for an expensive mission and required a radioisotope thermal generator for power. The trip to Jupiter also made for a long mission, 3 1/2 years to first solar perihelion, 8 years to second.

Following the appointment of Sean O'Keefe as Administrator of NASA, the entirety of the OPSP program was canceled as part of President George W. Bush's request for the 2003 United States federal budget. Administrator O'Keefe cited a need for a restructuring of NASA and its projects, falling in line with the Bush Administration's wish for NASA to refocus on "research and development, and addressing management shortcomings".

In the early 2010s, plans for the Solar Probe mission were incorporated into a lower-cost Solar Probe Plus. The redesigned mission uses multiple Venus gravity assists for a more direct flight path, which can be powered by solar panels. It has a higher perihelion, reducing the demands on the thermal protection system.

In May 2017, the spacecraft was renamed the Parker Solar Probe in honor of astrophysicist Eugene Newman Parker, who had proposed the existence of nanoflares as an explanation of coronal heating as well as having developed a mathematical theory that predicted the existence of solar wind. The solar probe cost NASA US$1.5 billion. The launch rocket bore a dedication in memory of APL engineer Andrew A. Dantzler who had worked on the project.

A memory card containing names submitted by over 1.1 million people was mounted on a plaque and installed below the spacecraft's high-gain antenna. The card also contains photos of Parker and a copy of his 1958 scientific paper predicting important aspects of solar physics.

== Spacecraft ==
The Parker Solar Probe is the first spacecraft to fly into the low solar corona. It will assess the structure and dynamics of the Sun's coronal plasma and magnetic field, the energy flow that heats the solar corona and impels the solar wind, and the mechanisms that accelerate energetic particles.

The spacecraft's systems are protected from the extreme heat and radiation near the Sun by a solar shield. Incident solar radiation at perihelion is approximately 650 kW/m^{2}, or 475 times the intensity at Earth orbit. The solar shield is hexagonal, mounted on the Sun-facing side of the spacecraft, 2.3 m (7 ft 7 in) in diameter, 11.4 cm (4.5 in) thick, and is made of two panels of reinforced carbon–carbon composite with a lightweight 11-centimeter-thick (4.5 in) carbon foam core, which is designed to withstand temperatures outside the spacecraft of about 1,370 °C (2,500 °F). The shield weighs only 73 kilograms (160 lb) and keeps the spacecraft's instruments at 29 °C (85 °F).

A white reflective alumina surface layer minimizes absorption. The spacecraft systems and scientific instruments are located in the central portion of the shield's shadow, where direct radiation from the Sun is fully blocked. If the shield was not between the spacecraft and the Sun, the probe would be damaged and become inoperative within tens of seconds. As radio communication with Earth takes about eight minutes in each direction, the Parker Solar Probe has to act autonomously and rapidly to protect itself. This is done using four light sensors to detect the first traces of direct sunlight coming from the shield limits and engaging movements from reaction wheels to reposition the spacecraft within the shadow again. According to project scientist Nicky Fox, the team described it as "the most autonomous spacecraft that has ever flown".

The primary power for the mission is a dual system of solar panels (photovoltaic arrays). A primary photovoltaic array, used for the portion of the mission outside 0.25 au, is retracted behind the shadow shield during the close approach to the Sun, and a much smaller secondary array powers the spacecraft through closest approach. This secondary array uses pumped-fluid cooling to maintain operating temperature of the solar panels and instrumentation.

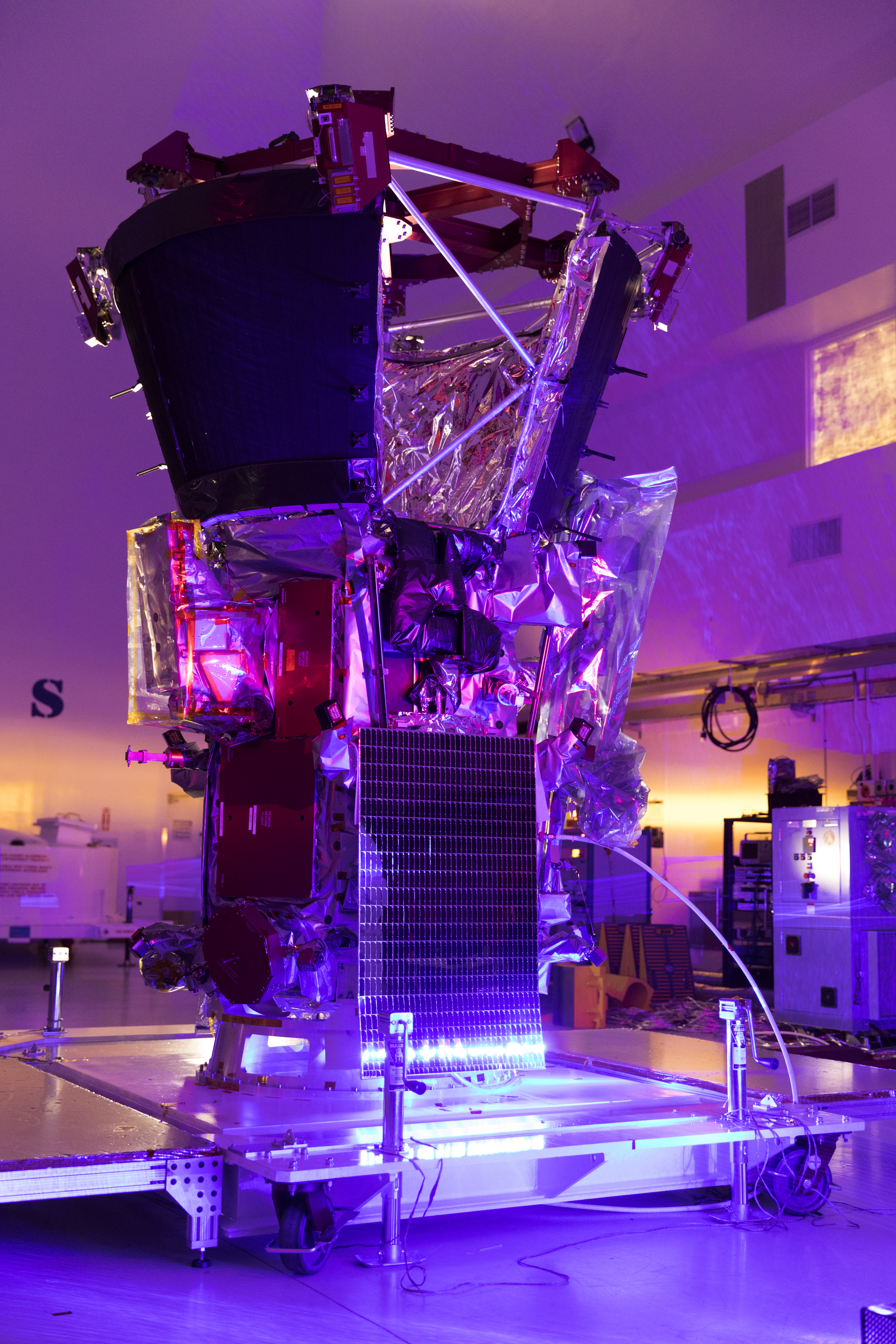
A light bar testing in the Astrotech processing facility

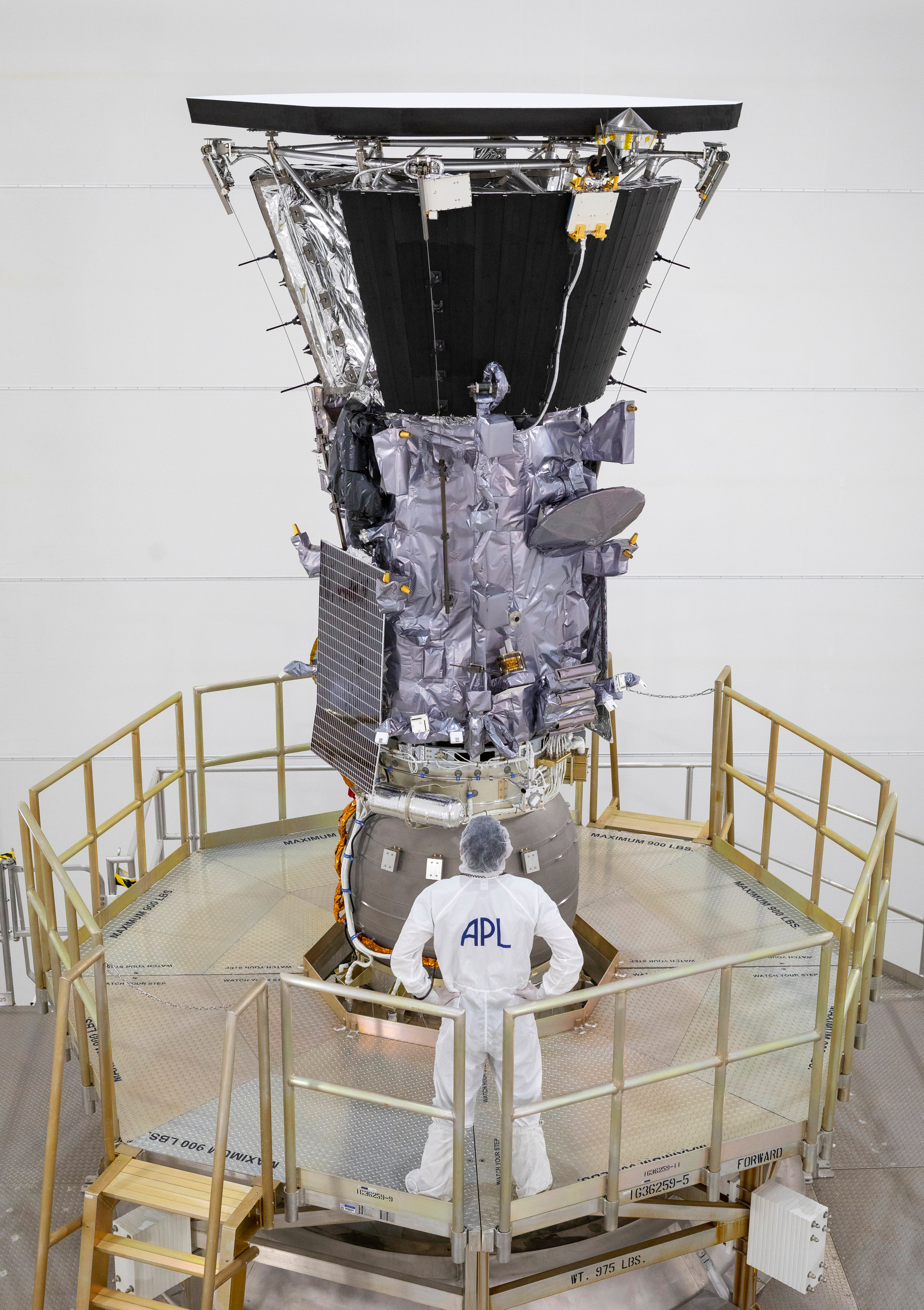
Parker Solar Probe mated to its third stage rocket motor

PSP during extensive environmental testing

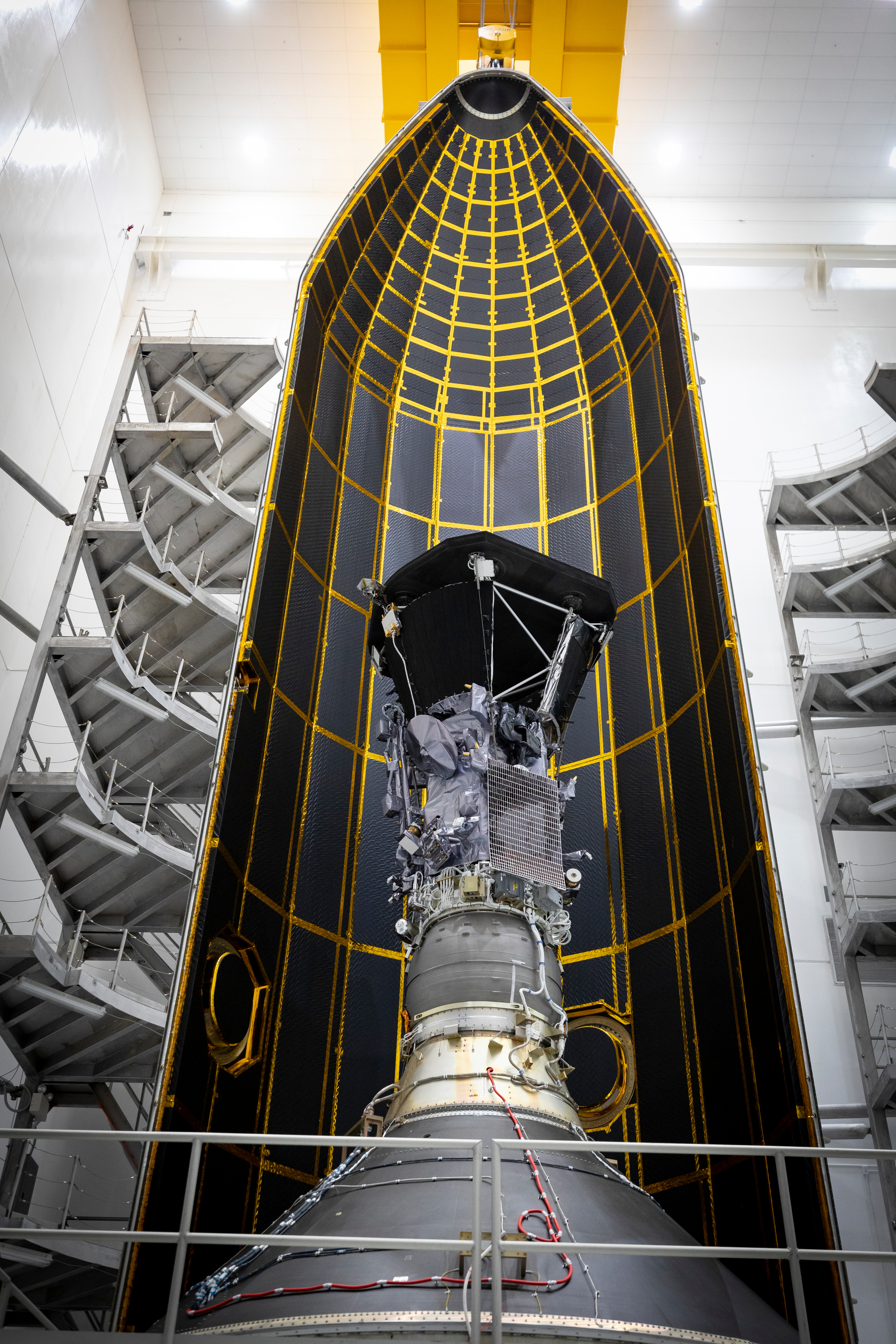
PSP encapsulated in fairing

The launch of the probe

== Trajectory ==
An animation of the Parker Solar Probe's trajectory from August 7, 2018, to August 29, 2025: Parker Solar Probe · Sun · Mercury · Venus · Earth For more detailed animation, see this video.

The Parker Solar Probe mission design used repeated gravity assists at Venus to incrementally decrease its orbital perihelion to achieve a final altitude (above the surface) of approximately 8.5 solar radii, or about 6×10^{6} km (3.7×10^{6} mi; 0.040 au). The spacecraft trajectory included seven Venus flybys over nearly seven years to gradually shrink its elliptical orbit around the Sun, for a total of 24 orbits. The near Sun radiation environment was predicted to cause spacecraft charging effects, radiation damage in materials and electronics, and communication interruptions, so the orbit is highly elliptical with short times spent near the Sun.

The trajectory required high launch energy, so the probe was launched on a Delta IV Heavy launch vehicle and an upper stage based on the Star 48BV solid rocket motor. Interplanetary gravity assists provided further deceleration relative to its heliocentric orbit, which resulted in a heliocentric speed record at perihelion. As the probe passed around the Sun in December 2024, it achieved a velocity of 690,000 km/h (430,000 mph) or 191 km/s (118.7 mi/s) in the heliocentric ecliptic reference frame, which temporarily made it the fastest human-made object, almost three times as fast as the previous record holder, Helios-2.

Launch injection was very close to predictions, but nevertheless required path correction. Trajectory was re-optimized after the launch to save fuel. The first Venus flyby was only 52 days after the launch; three trajectory correction maneuvers were performed in this window.

As described by Kepler's laws of planetary motion, which apply to any object in an orbit, gravity will cause the spacecraft to accelerate as it nears perihelion, then slow down again afterward until it reaches its aphelion. Because of its highly elliptical orbit and the Sun's strong gravity, this effect is particularly pronounced for the Parker Solar Probe. During a perihelion on September 27, 2023, the spacecraft traveled at 394,736 miles per hour (176.5 km/s), fast enough to fly from New York to Tokyo in just over a minute.

=== Final orbit and end of mission ===
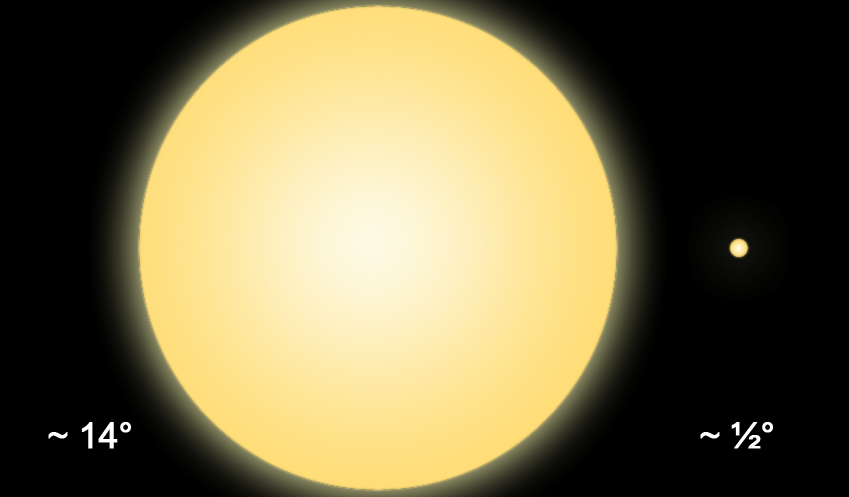
An apparent size of the Sun as seen from the Parker Solar Probe at perihelion compared to its apparent size seen from Earth

A visualization of PSP's projected orbit through 2029, assuming it continues to follow its current trajectory.

The PSP performed its final gravity assist on November 6, 2024. It set the spacecraft on a new orbit passing 6.16 million kilometers (3.83 million miles) from the surface of the Sun. A beacon transmission was made and received successfully on December 20 to confirm that the craft was operating normally ahead of the perihelion. The exact time of closest approach was 11:53 UTC on December 24 but the craft was out of contact at this time. A further beacon transmission confirming successful passage was received on December 26.

This final orbit is inside the orbit of Venus and so no further encounters with that planet are planned. PSP will continue in this orbit but requiring adjustment to maintain attitude so that its transmitters point at Earth. Eventually its thrusters will run out of fuel and full functioning will not then be possible. The plan is to then rotate the craft so that its instruments will be exposed to the full radiance of the Sun for the first time. This is expected to ablate and destroy them. The heat shield will remain and is expected to continue to orbit the Sun for millions of years.

PSP's main mission ended in 2025. In 2026, the extended mission was approved into 2029.

== Instruments ==
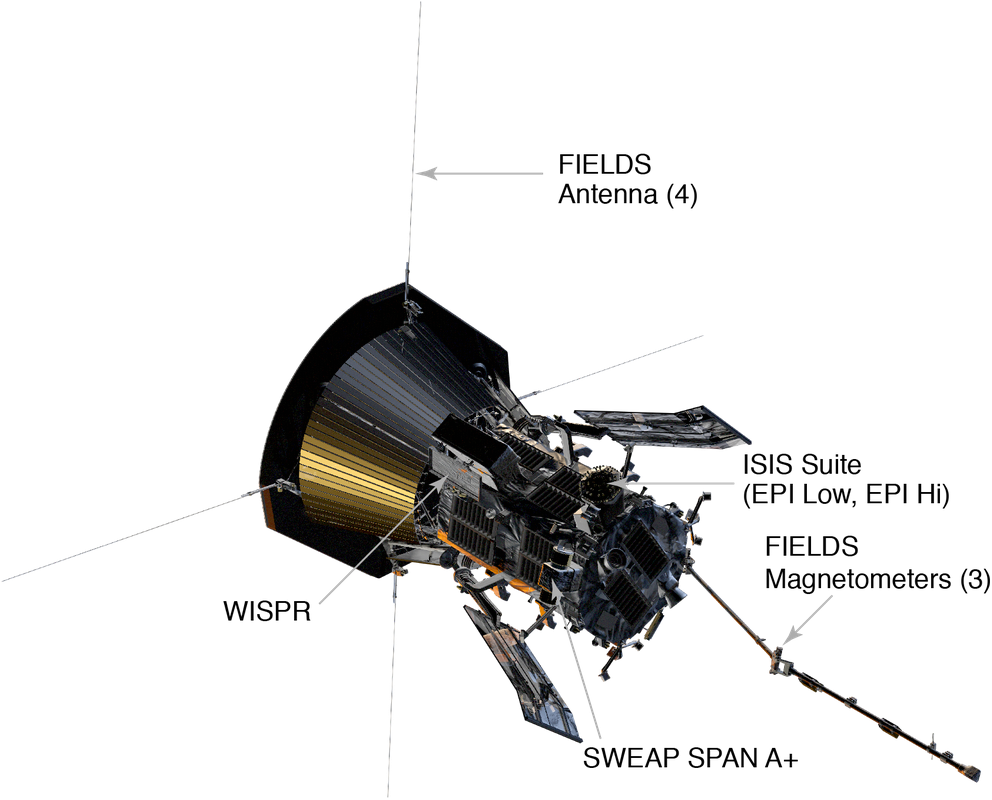
Schematic view of all PSP's instruments

Parker Solar Probe 3D model

Parker Solar Probe has four main instruments:

- FIELDS (Electromagnetic Fields Investigation). The instrument suite captures the scale and shape of electric and magnetic fields in the Sun's atmosphere. FIELDS measures waves and turbulence in the inner heliosphere with high time resolution to understand the fields associated with waves, shocks and magnetic reconnection, a process by which magnetic field lines explosively realign. FIELDS measures the electric field around the spacecraft with five antennas, four of which stick out beyond the spacecraft's heat shield and into the sunlight, where they experience temperatures of 1,370 °C (2,500 °F). The 2-meter-long (6 ft 7 in) antennas are made of a niobium alloy, which can withstand extreme temperatures. FIELDS measures electric fields across a broad frequency range both directly and remotely. Operating in two modes, the four sunlit antennas measure the properties of the fast and slow solar wind — the flow of solar particles constantly streaming out from the Sun. The fifth antenna, which sticks out perpendicular to the others in the shade of the heat shield, helps make a three-dimensional picture of the electric field at higher frequencies. The suite also has three magnetometers to assess the magnetic field. A search coil magnetometer, or SCM, measures how the magnetic field changes over time. Two identical fluxgate magnetometers, MAGi and MAGo, measure the large-scale coronal magnetic field. The fluxgate magnetometers are specialized for measuring the magnetic field further from the Sun where it varies at a slower rate, while the search coil magnetometer is necessary closer to the Sun where the field changes quickly, as it can sample the magnetic field at a rate of two million times per second. The Principal Investigator is Stuart Bale at the University of California, Berkeley.
- IS☉IS (Integrated Science Investigation of the Sun). The instrument uses two complementary instruments to measure particles across a wide range of energies. By measuring electrons, protons and ions, IS☉IS will understand the particles' lifecycles — where they came from, how they became accelerated and how they move out from the Sun through interplanetary space. The two energetic particle instruments on IS☉IS are called EPI-Lo and EPI-Hi (EPI stands for Energetic Particle Instrument). EPI-Lo measures the spectra of electrons and ions and identifies carbon, oxygen, neon, magnesium, silicon, iron and two isotopes of helium, He-3 and He-4. Distinguishing between helium isotopes will help determine which of several theorized mechanisms caused the particles' acceleration. The instrument has a design with an octagonal dome body supporting 80 viewfinders. Multiple viewfinders provide a wide field of view to observe low-energy particles. An ion that enters EPI-Lo through one of the viewfinders first passes through two carbon-polyimide-aluminum foils and then encounters a solid-state detector. Upon impact, the foils produce electrons, which are measured by a microchannel plate. Using the amount of energy left by the ion's impact on the detector and the time it takes the ions to pass through the sensor identifies the species of the particles. EPI-Hi uses three particle sensors composed of stacked layers of detectors to measure particles with energies higher than those measured by EPI-Lo. The front few layers are composed of ultra-thin silicon detectors made up of geometric segments, which allows for the determination of the particle's direction and helps reduce background noise. Charged particles are identified by measuring how deep they travel into the stack of detectors and how many electrons they pull off atoms in each detector, a process called ionization. At closest approach to the Sun, EPI-Hi will be able to detect up to 100,000 particles per second. The Principal Investigator is David McComas at Princeton University.
- WISPR (Wide-field Imager for Solar Probe). These optical telescopes acquire images of the corona and inner heliosphere. WISPR uses two cameras with radiation-hardened Active Pixel Sensor CMOS detectors. The camera's lenses are made of a radiation hard BK7, a common type of glass used for space telescopes, which is also sufficiently hardened against the impacts of dust. The Principal Investigator is Russell Howard at the Naval Research Laboratory.
- SWEAP (Solar Wind Electrons Alphas and Protons). This investigation will count the electrons, protons and helium ions, and measure their properties such as velocity, density, and temperature. Its main instruments are the Solar Probe Analyzers (SPAN, two electrostatic analyzers) and the Solar Probe Cup (SPC). SPC is a Faraday cup, a metal device that can catch charged particles in a vacuum. Peeking over the heat shield to measure how electrons and ions are moving, the cup is exposed to the full light, heat and energy of the Sun. The cup is composed of a series of highly transparent grids—one of which uses variable high voltages to sort the particles—above several collector plates, which measure the particles' properties. The variable voltage grid also helps sort out background noise, such as cosmic rays and photoionized electrons, which could otherwise bias the measurements. The grids, located near the front of the instrument, can reach temperatures of 1,650 °C (3,000 °F), glowing red while the instrument makes measurements. The instrument uses pieces of sapphire to electrically isolate different components within the cup. As it passes close to the Sun, SPC takes up to 146 measurements per second to accurately determine the velocity, density and temperature of the Sun's plasma. SPAN is composed of two instruments, SPAN-A and SPAN-B, which have wide fields of view to allow them to see the parts of space not observed by SPC. Particles encountering the detectors enter a maze that sends the particles through a series of deflectors and voltages to sort the particles based on their mass and charge. While SPAN-A has two components to measure both electrons and ions, SPAN-B looks only at electrons. The Principal Investigator is Justin Kasper at the University of Michigan and the Smithsonian Astrophysical Observatory.

An additional theoretical investigation named Heliospheric origins with Solar Probe Plus (HeliOSPP) starting from 2010 and ending in 2024 has the role of providing theoretical input and independent assessment of scientific performance to the Science Working Group (SWG) and the SPP Project to maximize the scientific return from the mission. The Principal Investigator is Marco Velli at the University of California, Los Angeles and the Jet Propulsion Laboratory; he also serves as the Observatory Scientist for the mission.

== Mission ==
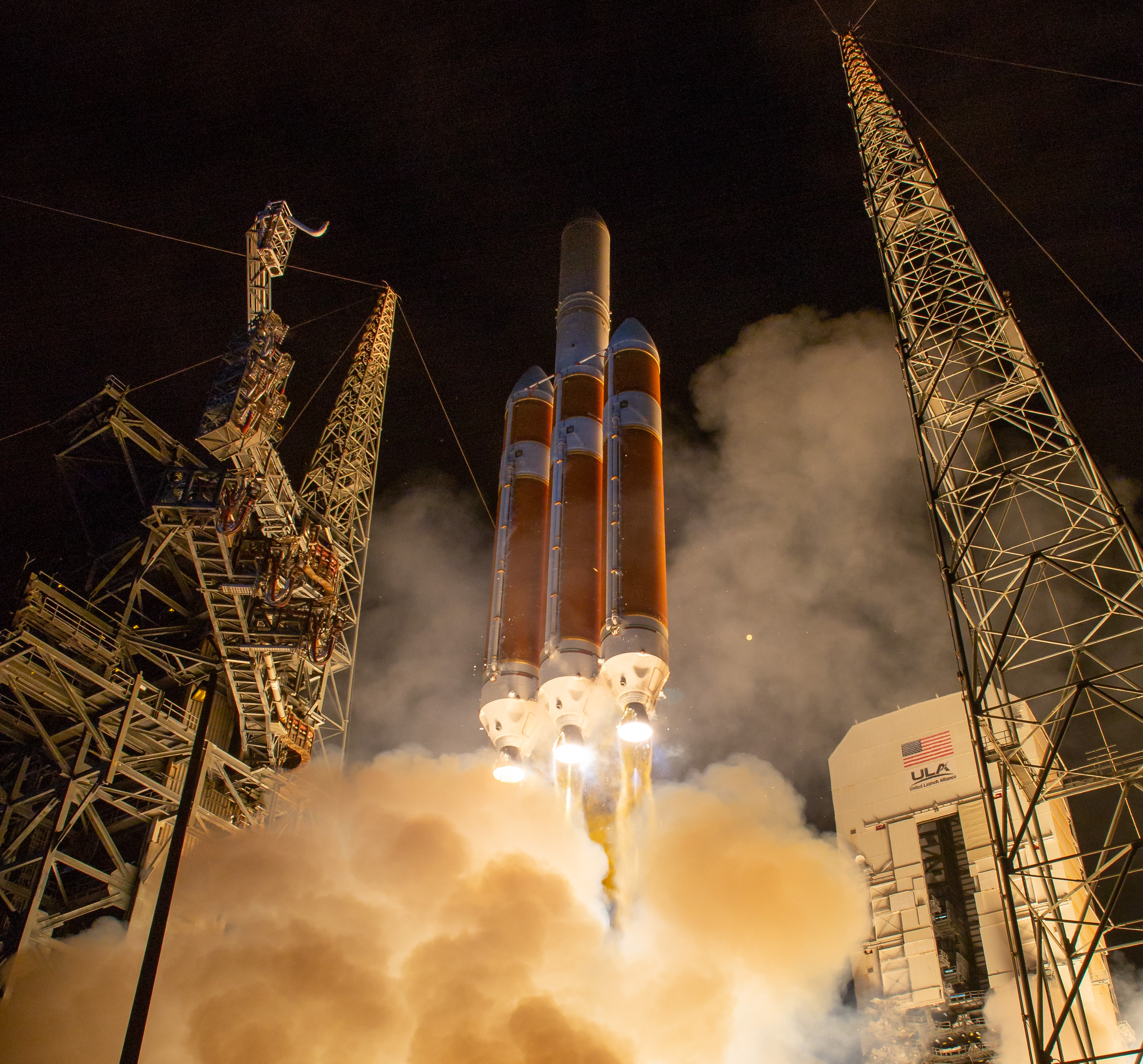
Launch of the Parker Solar Probe in 2018

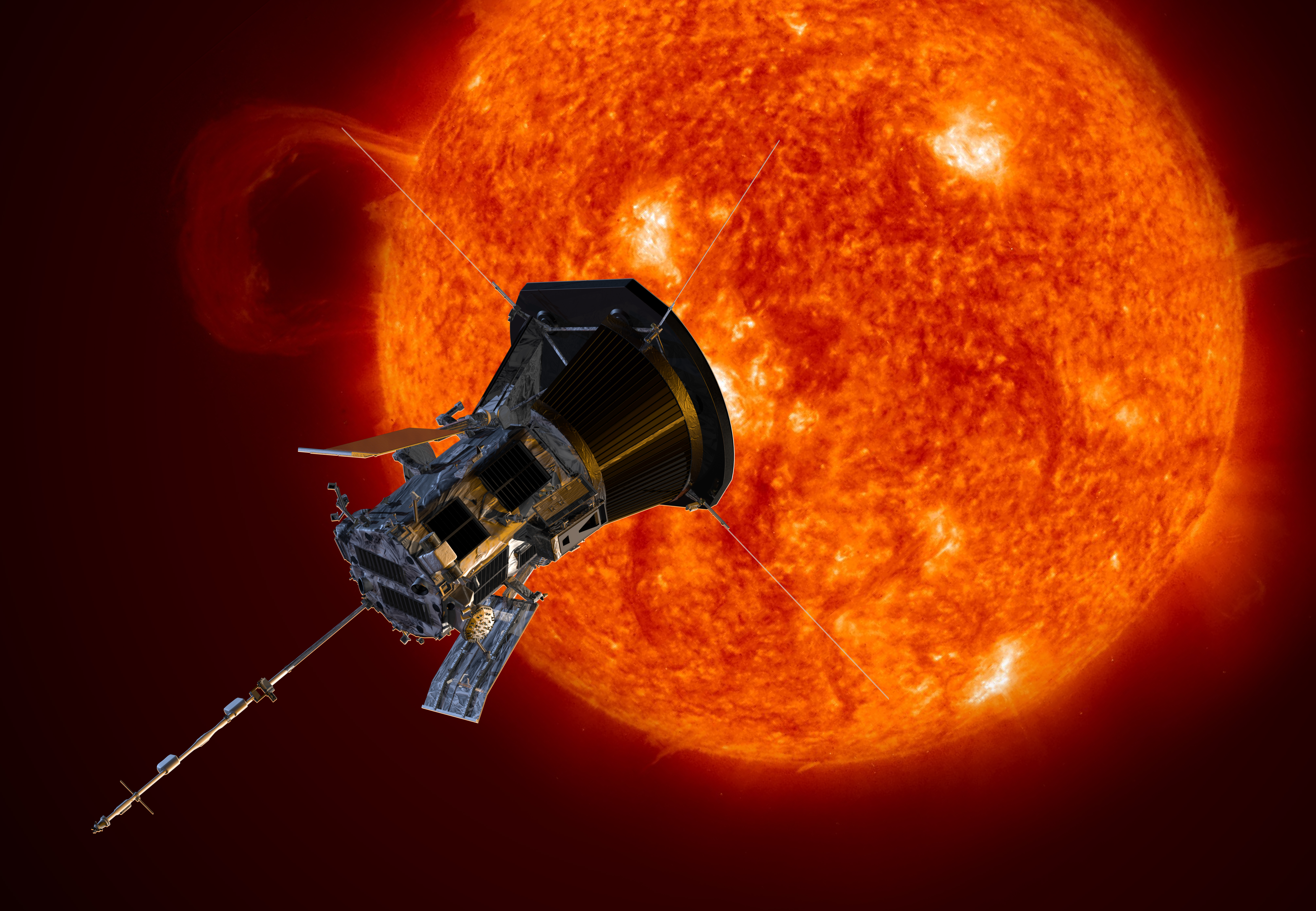
Artist's rendition of the Parker Solar Probe approaching the Sun

The Parker Solar Probe was launched on August 12, 2018, at 07:31 UTC. The spacecraft operated nominally after launching. During its first week in space it deployed its high-gain antenna, magnetometer boom, and electric field antennas. The spacecraft performed its first scheduled trajectory correction on August 20, 2018, while it was 8.8 million kilometers (5.5 million mi) from Earth, and travelling at 63,569 kilometers per hour (39,500 mph)

Instrument activation and testing began in early September 2018. On September 9, 2018, the two WISPR telescopic cameras performed a successful first-light test, transmitting wide-angle images of the background sky towards the Galactic Center.

The probe successfully performed the first of the seven planned Venus flybys on October 3, 2018, where it came within about 2,400 kilometers (1,500 mi) of Venus in order to reduce the probe's speed and orbit closer to the Sun.

The second flyby of Venus on December 26, 2019. The velocity decreases by 2.9 km/s to 26 km/s (red circle), shifting the spacecraft to a new orbit closer to the Sun.

Within each orbit of the Parker Solar Probe around the Sun, the portion within 0.25 AU is the Science Phase, in which the probe is actively and autonomously making observations. Communication with the probe is largely cut off in that phase. Science phases run for a few days both before and after each perihelion. They lasted 11.6 days for the earliest perihelion, and will drop to 9.6 days for the final, closest perihelion.

Much of the rest of each orbit is devoted to transmitting data from the science phase. But during this part of each orbit, there are still periods when communication is not possible. First, the requirement that the heat shield of the probe be pointed towards the Sun sometimes puts the heat shield between the antenna and Earth. Second, even when the probe is not particularly near the Sun, when the angle between the probe and the Sun, as seen from Earth, is too small, the Sun's radiation can overwhelm the communication link.

After the first Venus flyby, the probe was in an elliptical orbit with a period of 150 days (two-thirds the period of Venus), making three orbits while Venus makes two. After the second flyby, the period shortened to 130 days. After less than two orbits, only 198 days later, it encountered Venus a third time at a point earlier in the orbit of Venus. This encounter shortened its period to half of that of Venus, or about 112.5 days. After two orbits it met Venus a fourth time at about the same place, shortening its period to about 102 days.

After 237 days, it met Venus for the fifth time and its period was shortened to about 96 days, three-sevenths that of Venus. It then made seven orbits while Venus made three. The sixth encounter, almost two years after the fifth, shortened its period down to 92 days, two-fifths that of Venus. After five more orbits (two orbits of Venus), it met Venus for the seventh and last time, decreasing its period to 88 or 89 days and allowing it to approach closer to the Sun.

== Timeline ==
The speed of the probe and distance from the Sun, from launch until 2026

List of events
Year	Date	Event	Perihelion distance (km) (Note: For altitude above the surface, subtract one solar radius ≈0.7 million km.)	Speed (km/s) (Note: Speeds are given in the heliocentric ecliptic reference frame.)	Orbital period (days)	Notes
Year	Date	Event	Flyby altitude over Venus (Note: Details on Venus flybys from Guo et al. This was published in 2014, four years before the mission began. For a variety of reasons, including the fact that the launch had to be delayed at the last minute, actual details could differ from the ones presented in the work.)	Leg of Parker's orbit (Note: Inbound indicates that the Venus flyby will take place after Parker's aphelion (in the case of the first flyby, after its launch), on its way to perihelion. Outbound indicates that the Venus flyby will take place after Parker's perihelion, on its way to aphelion.)	Inside/Outside orbit of Venus (Note: Inside indicates that the probe will pass in between Venus and the Sun. Outside indicates that the probe will pass beyond Venus from the Sun; the probe will briefly pass through Venus's shadow in those instances.)	Notes
2018	August 12; 07:31 UTC	Launch	–	–	–	
2018	October 3; 08:44 UTC	Venus flyby #1	2548 km (Note: The altitude is from the source cited, dated 2014. 2548 km comes to 1583 mi. NASA's and Johns Hopkins's press releases (identical), say "...came within about 1500 miles of Venus' surface..." A NASA blog, says, "...completed its flyby of Venus at a distance of about 1500 miles..." Other news reports, presumably taking that information, also provide a figure of 2414 km. But neither the NASA/Hopkins press release nor the blog gives a figure in kilometers. Both the NASA and Hopkins press releases say that the flyby reduced the speed of the Parker Solar Probe (relative to the Sun) by about 10%, or 7000 mph. This altered the orbit, bringing perihelion about 4 million miles closer to the Sun than it would have been without the gravity assist.)	Inbound	Inside	Flybys 1 and 2 occur at the same point in Venus's orbit.
2018	November 6; 03:27 UTC	Perihelion #1	24.8×10^{6} (Note: By way of comparison, the planet Mercury orbits the Sun at a distance varying from about 46,001,200 km at its closest to about 69,816,900 km at its farthest.)	95	150	Solar encounter phase October 31 – November 11
2019	April 4; 22:40 UTC	Perihelion #2	24.8×10^{6}	95	150	Solar encounter phase March 30 – April 10
2019	September 1; 17:50 UTC	Perihelion #3	24.8×10^{6}	95	150	Solar encounter phase August 16 – September 20 (Note: After the second solar encounter phase, Parker Solar Probe was able to download much more data than NASA had expected. So NASA announced a substantial extension of the third solar encounter phase from 11 days to about 35 days. The observational instruments were turned on when Parker Solar Probe came within 0.45 au on the inbound trip, and are planned to run until the probe reaches about 0.50 au outbound.)
2019	December 26; 18:14 UTC	Venus flyby #2	3023 km	Inbound	Inside	Flybys 1 and 2 occur at the same point in Venus's orbit.
2020	January 29; 09:37 UTC	Perihelion #4	19.4×10^{6}	109	130	Solar encounter phase January 23 – February 29
2020	June 7; 08:23 UTC	Perihelion #5	19.4×10^{6}	109	130	Solar encounter phase May 9 – June 28
2020	July 11; 03:22 UTC	Venus flyby #3	834 km	Outbound	Outside (Note: The third flyby of Venus was the first to pass behind Venus from the point of view of the Sun. The probe was in Venus's shadow, obscured from the Sun, for about 11 minutes, and passed through a so-called "tail" of Venus – a trail of charged particles from the atmosphere of Venus. The probe's instruments were to be turned on to make observations.)	Flybys 3 and 4 occur at the same point in Venus's orbit.
2020	September 27	Perihelion #6	14.2×10^{6}	129	112.5	
2021	January 17	Perihelion #7	14.2×10^{6}	129	112.5	
2021	February 20	Venus flyby #4	2392 km	Outbound	Outside	Flybys 3 and 4 occur at the same point in Venus's orbit.
2021	April 28	Perihelion #8	11.1×10^{6}	147	102	First perihelion to enter the solar corona
2021	August 9	Perihelion #9	11.1×10^{6}	147	102	
2021	October 16	Venus flyby #5	3786 km	Inbound	Inside	Flybys 5 and 6 occur at the same point in Venus's orbit.
2021	November 21	Perihelion #10	9.2×10^{6}	163	96	
2022	February 25	Perihelion #11	9.2×10^{6}	163	96	
2022	June 1	Perihelion #12	9.2×10^{6}	163	96	
2022	September 6	Perihelion #13	9.2×10^{6}	163	96	
2022	December 11	Perihelion #14	9.2×10^{6}	163	96	
2023	March 17	Perihelion #15	9.2×10^{6}	163	96	
2023	June 22	Perihelion #16	9.2×10^{6}	163	96	
2023	August 21	Venus flyby #6	3939 km	Inbound	Inside	Flybys 5 and 6 occur at the same point in Venus's orbit.
2023	September 27	Perihelion #17	7.9×10^{6}	176	92	
2023	December 29	Perihelion #18	7.9×10^{6}	176	92	
2024	March 30	Perihelion #19	7.9×10^{6}	176	92	
2024	June 30	Perihelion #20	7.9×10^{6}	176	92	
2024	September 30	Perihelion #21	7.9×10^{6}	176	92	
2024	November 6	Venus flyby #7	317 km	Outbound	Outside	
2024	December 24	Perihelion #22	6.9×10^{6}	192	88	
2025	March 22	Perihelion #23	6.9×10^{6}	192	88	
2025	June 19	Perihelion #24	6.9×10^{6}	192	88	
2025	September 15	Perihelion #25	6.9×10^{6}	192	88	
2025	December 12	Perihelion #26	6.9×10^{6}	192	88	
2026	March 11	Perihelion #27				
2026	June 8	Perihelion #28				
2026	September 4	Perihelion #29				

== Findings ==
PSP observed switchbacks — traveling disturbances in the solar wind that caused the magnetic field to bend back on itself.

NASA animation of the Probe passing through the Sun's stellar corona. Inside the boundary at the corona's edge, its Alfvén critical surface, plasma connects to the Sun by waves traveling back and forth to the surface.

On November 6, 2018, Parker Solar Probe observed its first magnetic switchbacks – sudden reversals in the direction of the magnetic field carried by the solar wind. They were first observed by the NASA-ESA mission Ulysses, the first spacecraft to fly over the Sun's poles. The switchbacks generate heat that warms solar corona.

On December 4, 2019, the first four research papers were published describing findings during the spacecraft's first two dives near the Sun. They reported the direction and strength of the Sun's magnetic field, and described the unusually frequent and short-lived changes in the direction of the Sun's magnetic field. These measurements confirm the hypothesis that Alfvén waves are the leading candidates for understanding the mechanisms that underlie the coronal heating problem. The probe observed approximately a thousand "rogue" magnetic waves in the solar atmosphere that instantly increase solar wind speeds by as much as 300,000 miles per hour (480,000 km/h) and in some cases completely reverse the local magnetic field.

They also reported that, using the "beam of electrons that stream along the magnetic field", they were able to observe that "the reversals in the Sun's magnetic field are often associated with localized enhancements in the radial component of the plasma velocity (the velocity in the direction away from the Sun's center)". The researchers found a "surprisingly large azimuthal component of the plasma velocity (the velocity perpendicular to the radial direction). This component results from the force with which the Sun's rotation slingshots plasma out of the corona when the plasma is released from the coronal magnetic field".

PSP discovered evidence of a cosmic dust-free zone of 3.5 million miles (5.6 million kilometers) radius from the Sun, due to vaporisation of cosmic dust particles by the Sun's radiation.

On April 28, 2021, during its eighth flyby of the Sun, Parker Solar Probe encountered the specific magnetic and particle conditions at 18.8 solar radii that indicated that it penetrated the Alfvén surface; the probe measured the solar wind plasma environment with its FIELDS and SWEAP instruments. This event was described by NASA as "touching the Sun".

On September 25, 2022, the first discovery of a comet was made in images from the Parker Solar Probe. The comet is named PSP-001. It was found by Peter Berrett, who participates in the NASA funded Sungrazer project. PSP-001 was discovered in images from May 29, 2022, part of the spacecraft's 12th approach to the Sun.

Since this discovery, a further 19 sungrazing comets have been discovered in the images taken by the Parker Solar Probe, including three non-group comets.

Designation	Comet classification	Image date	Discovery date	Discoverer
PSP-001	Kreutz	May 29, 2022	Sep 25, 2022	Peter Berrett
PSP-002	Kreutz	Sep 1, 2022	N/A	Karl Battams
PSP-003	Kreutz	Sep 2, 2022	N/A	Karl Battams
PSP-004	Kreutz	Sep 1, 2022	N/A	Karl Battams
PSP-005	Kreutz	Nov 18, 2021	Feb 11, 2023	Peter Berrett
PSP-006	Non Group	Dec 11, 2022	May 13, 2023	Peter Berrett
PSP-007	Kreutz	Mar 12, 2023	Jul 12, 2023	Karl Battams
PSP-008	Non Group	Dec 6, 2022	Jul 16, 2023	Rafał Biros
PSP-009	Kreutz	Apr 25, 2021	Jul 28, 2023	Rafał Biros
PSP-010	Kreutz	Apr 25, 2021	Jul 28, 2023	Rafał Biros
PSP-011	Kreutz	Nov 17, 2021	Jul 24, 2023	Rafał Biros
PSP-012	Kreutz	Feb 21, 2022	Jul 30, 2023	Rafał Biros
PSP-013	Kreutz	Feb 15, 2022	Jul 27, 2022	Peter Berrett
PSP-014	Kreutz	Aug 4, 2021	Aug 3, 2023	Rafał Biros
PSP-015	Kreutz	Aug 5–6, 2021	Aug 3, 2023	Rafał Biros
PSP-016	Kreutz	May 29, 2022	Aug 4, 2023	Rafał Biros
PSP-017	Kreutz	Jan 12, 2021	Aug 16, 2023	Robert Pickard
PSP-018	Kreutz	Jun 19, 2023	Oct 13, 2023	Peter Berrett
PSP-019	Non Group	Sep 27, 2023	Nov 2, 2023	Guillermo Stenborg
PSP-020	Kreutz	Jan 13, 2021	Aug 8, 2023	Peter Berrett

In 2024, it was reported that the probe detected a Kelvin-Helmholtz instability (KHI) during an observed coronal mass ejection. It is the first spacecraft that detected this long theorized event.

== Collaborations ==
The PSP and ESA-NASA Solar Orbiter (SolO) missions cooperated to trace solar wind and transients from their sources on the Sun to the inner interplanetary space.

In 2022, PSP and SolO planners collaborated to study why the Sun's atmosphere is "150 times hotter" than its surface. SolO observed the Sun from 140 million kilometers, while PSP simultaneously observed the Sun's corona during flyby at a distance of nearly 9 million kilometers.

In March 2024, both space probes were at their closest approaches to the Sun, PSP at 7.3 million km, and SolO at 45 million km. SolO observed the Sun, while PSP sampled the plasma of the solar wind, allowing scientists to compare data from both probes.

Coordinated observations were also done with SOHO and STEREO-A spacecraft.

== Gallery ==
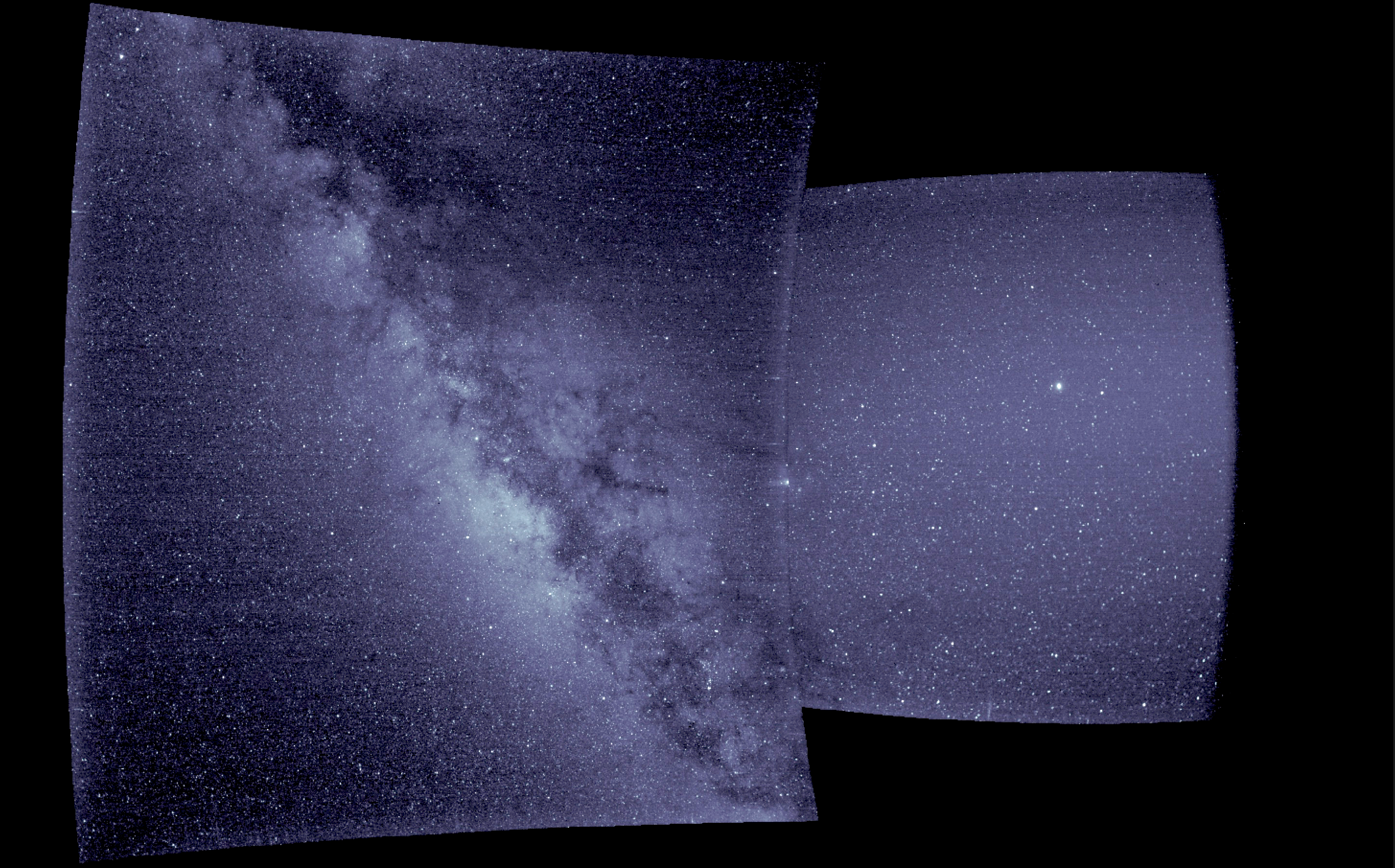
WISPR first light image. The right portion of the image is from WISPR's inner telescope, which is a 40-degree field of view and begins 58.5 degrees from the Sun's center. The left portion is from the outer telescope, which is a 58-degree field of view and ends about 160 degrees from the Sun.

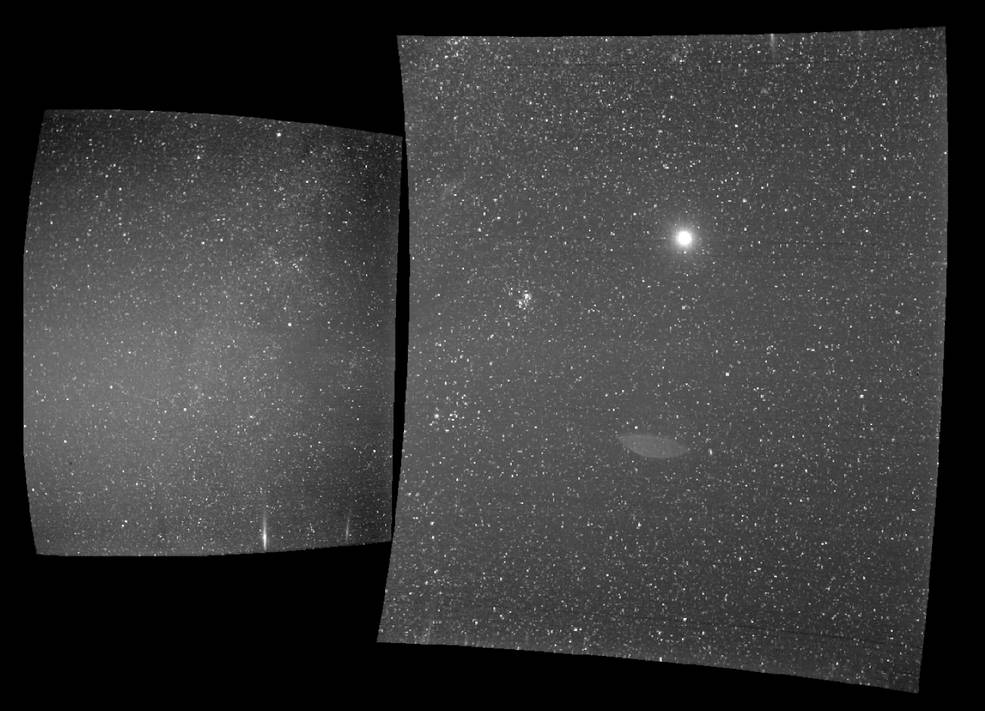
The view from the probe's WISPR instrument on Sept. 25, 2018, shows Earth, the bright sphere near the middle of the right-hand panel. The elongated mark toward the bottom of the panel is a lens reflection from the WISPR instrument

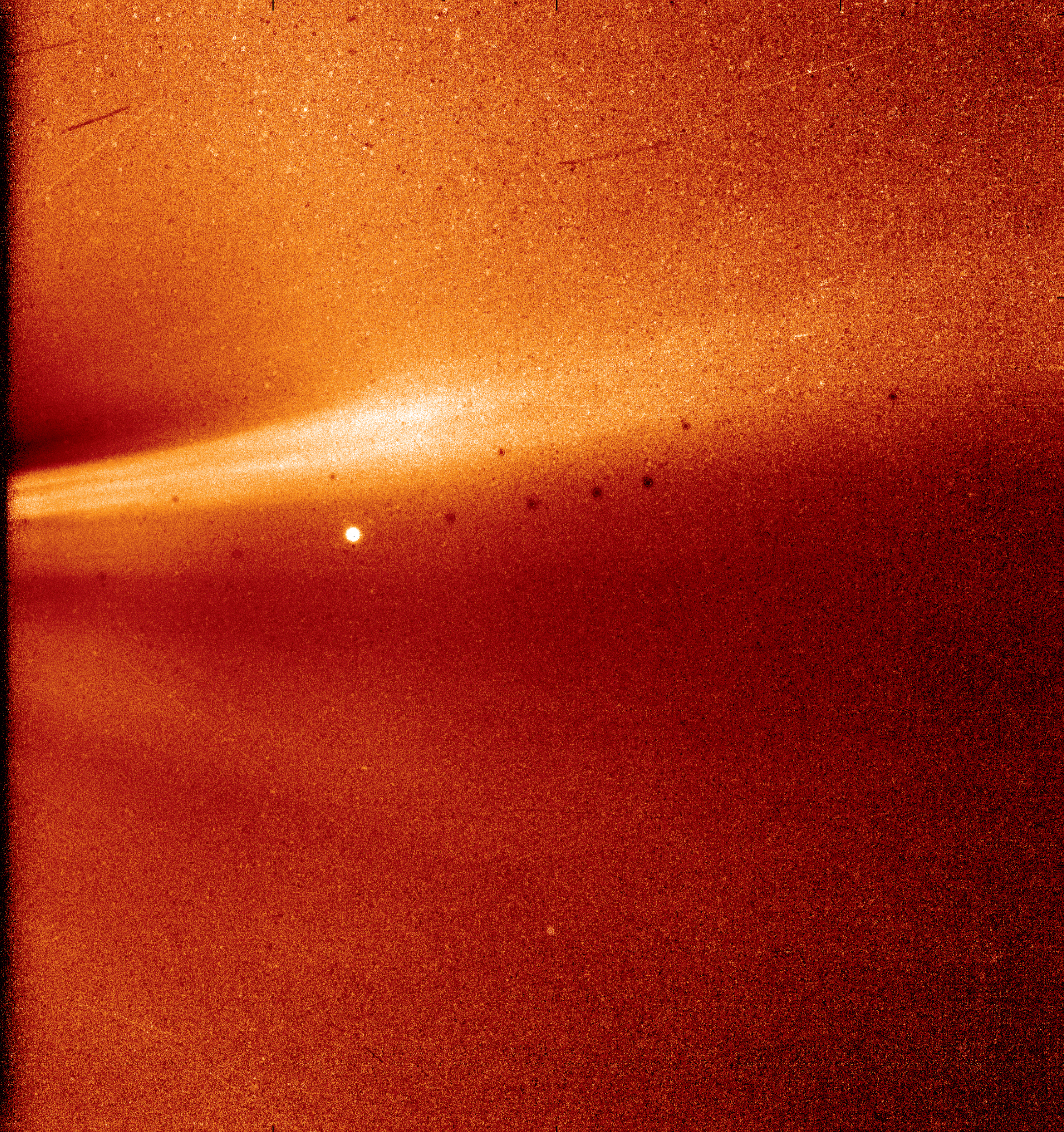
Photo from the WISPR shows a coronal streamer, seen over the east limb of the Sun on Nov. 8, 2018, at 1:12 a.m. EST. The fine structure of the streamer is very clear, with at least two rays visible. Parker Solar Probe was about 16.9 million miles (21.2 million km) from the Sun's surface when this image was taken. The bright object near the center of the image is Mercury, and the dark spots are a result of background correction.

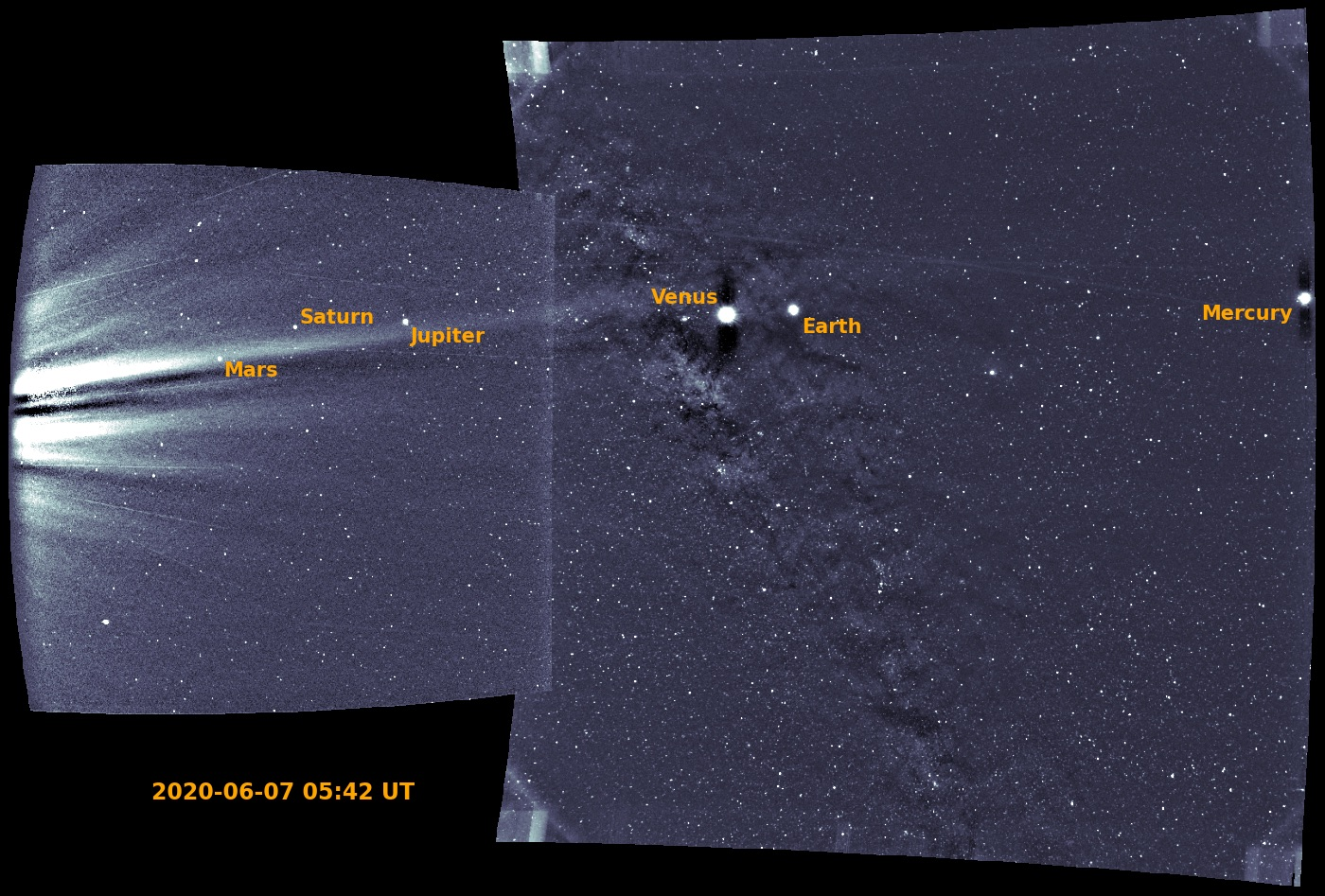
When Parker Solar Probe was making its closest approach to the Sun on June 7, 2020, WISPR captured the planets Mercury, Venus, Earth, Mars, Jupiter and Saturn in its field of view

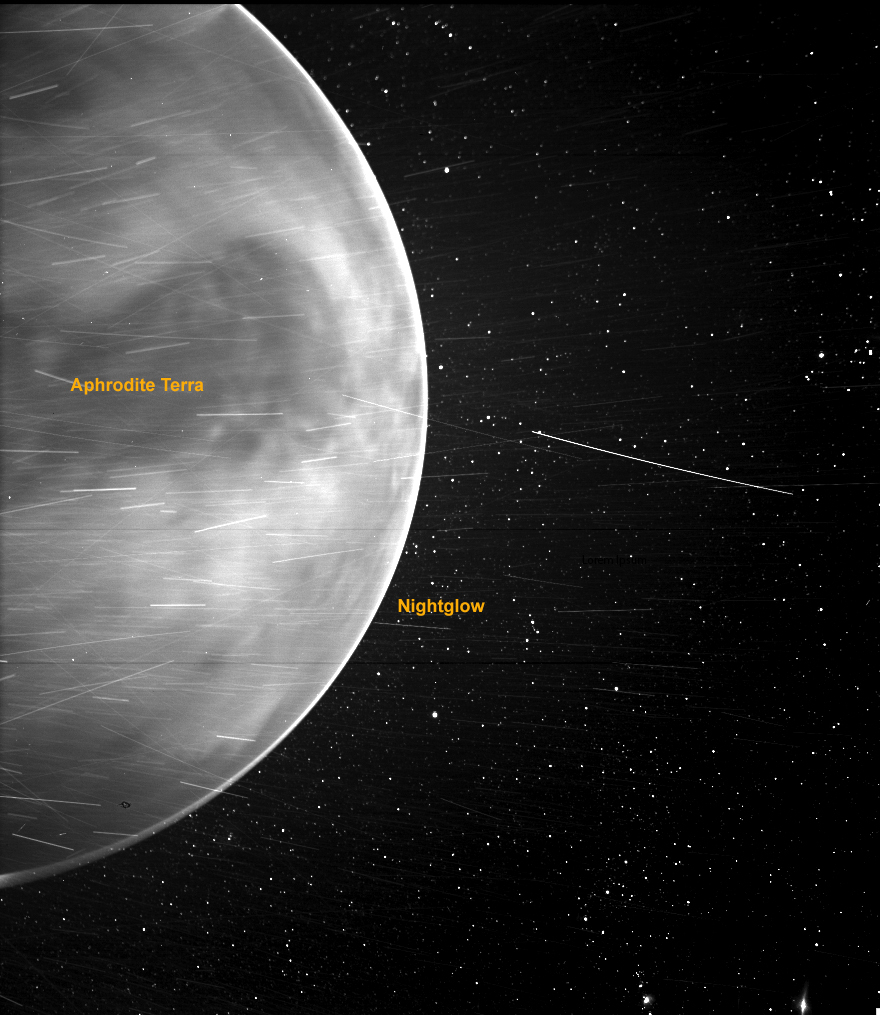
Photo taken by the probe during its second Venus flyby, July 2020

As Parker Solar Probe flew by Venus on its fourth flyby, its WISPR instrument captured these images, showing the nightside surface of the planet

As the probe passed through the Sun's corona in early 2021, it flew by structures called coronal streamers (timelapse encompassing 4 days)

This video by WISPR during its record-breaking flyby of the Sun on Dec. 25, 2024, shows the solar wind racing out from the Sun's outer atmosphere, the corona.

== See also ==
- Living With a Star – NASA scientific research program
- List of heliophysics missions
- List of vehicle speed records
- Spacecraft thermal control – Process of keeping all parts of a spacecraft within acceptable temperature ranges
