= 2003 United States federal budget =

2003 Budget of the United States federal government
- Submitted: February 4, 2002
- Submitted by: George W. Bush
- Submitted to: 107th Congress
- Country: United States
- Total revenue: $2.05 trillion (requested) $1.78 trillion (actual); 15.7% of GDP (actual)
- Total expenditures: $2.13 trillion (requested) $2.16 trillion (actual); 19.1% of GDP (actual)
- Deficit: $80 billion (requested) $375.3 billion (actual); 3.3% of GDP (actual)
- Debt: $6.76 trillion (at fiscal end); 59.7% of GDP
- GDP: $11.33 trillion
- Website: Office of Management and Budget

The 2003 United States Federal Budget began as a proposal by President George W. Bush to fund government operations for October 1, 2002 – September 30, 2003. The requested budget was submitted to the 107th Congress on February 4, 2002.

== Total Receipts ==
2003 Actual Receipts by Source
1. Individual income tax (44.6%)
2. Social Security/other payroll tax (40.0%)
3. Corporate income tax (7.40%)
4. Excise tax (3.80%)
5. Estate and gift taxes (1.20%)
6. Customs duties (1.10%)
7. Other miscellaneous receipts (2.00%)

Receipts by source: (in billions of dollars)

Source	Requested	Actual
Individual income tax	1,006	794
Corporate income tax	205	132
Social Security and other payroll tax	749	713
Excise tax	69	68
Estate and gift taxes	23	22
Customs duties	20	20
Other miscellaneous receipts	−25	35
Total	2,048	1,782

== Total Outlays ==
Outlays by budget function (in millions)

Function	Title	Actual
050	National Defense	$404,733
150	International Affairs	$21,199
250	General Science, Space and Technology	$20,831
270	Energy	$−725
300	Natural Resources and Environment	$29,667
350	Agriculture	$22,496
370	Commerce and Housing Credit	$727
400	Transportation	$67,069
450	Community and Regional Development	$18,850
500	Education, Training, Employment and Social Services	$82,587
550	Health	$219,541
570	Medicare	$249,433
600	Income Security	$334,632
650	Social Security	$474,680
700	Veterans Benefits and Services	$56,984
750	Administration of Justice	$35,340
800	General Government	$23,164
900	Net Interest	$153,073
920	Allowances	$-
950	Undistributed Offsetting Receipts	$−54,382
	Total	$2,159,899
