= Helmet streamer =

Structure in the Sun's corona

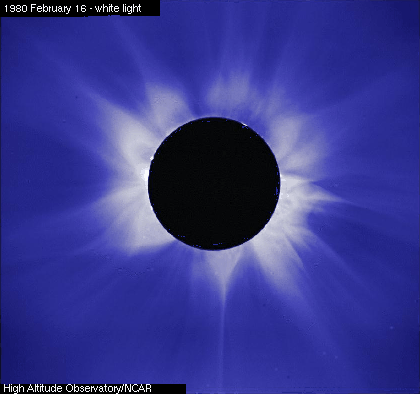
Helmet streamers can be seen pointing radially outward away from the Sun in coronagraph images.

Helmet streamers, also known as coronal streamers, are elongated cusp-like structures in the Sun's corona which are often visible in white-light coronagraphs and during solar eclipses. They are closed magnetic loops which lie above divisions between regions of opposite magnetic polarity on the Sun's surface. The solar wind elongates these loops to pointed tips which can extend a solar radius or more into the corona.

During solar minimum, helmet streamers are found closer to the heliographic equator, whereas during solar maximum they are found more symmetrically distributed around the Sun.

== Structure ==
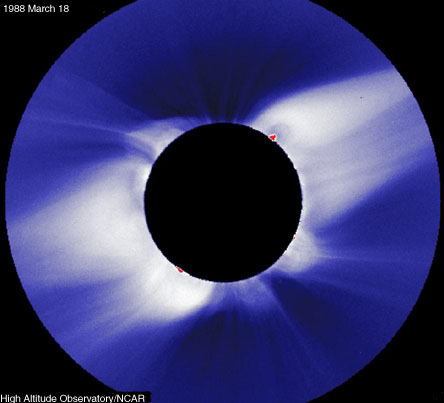
Helmet streamers appear bright in white-light relative to the surrounding coronal plasma.

Helmet streamers have cusp-like bases that taper radially outward away from the Sun forming long stalks. The base typically extends up to 1.5 solar radii above the surface, whereas the stalk—stretched outward by the solar wind—can extend over many solar radii.

Helmet streamers are structured by closed magnetic fields and lie above boundaries separating opposite magnetic polarity in the Sun's photosphere. Their thin stalks consist of oppositely directed magnetic fields which form current sheets. Surrounding these stalks are open, oppositely directed magnetic fields which are anchored to coronal holes lower in the corona.

The white-light emissions of helmet streamers is due to the high electron density of the confined plasma relative to the surrounding corona. Light from the photosphere is Thomson scattered off of these electrons with the intensity of scattered light depending on the number of electrons along the observer's line of sight.

Small blobs of plasma, or "plasmoids" are sometimes released from the tips of helmet streamers, and this is one source of the slow component of the solar wind.

== Solar cycle ==
Around solar minimum, the point of minimum solar activity during the 11-year solar cycle, helmet streamers are generally located around the heliographic equator in what is referred to as the streamer belt. At the same time, large coronal holes are present at the poles. As solar activity increases near the solar maximum, helmet streamers appear more symmetrically around the Sun.

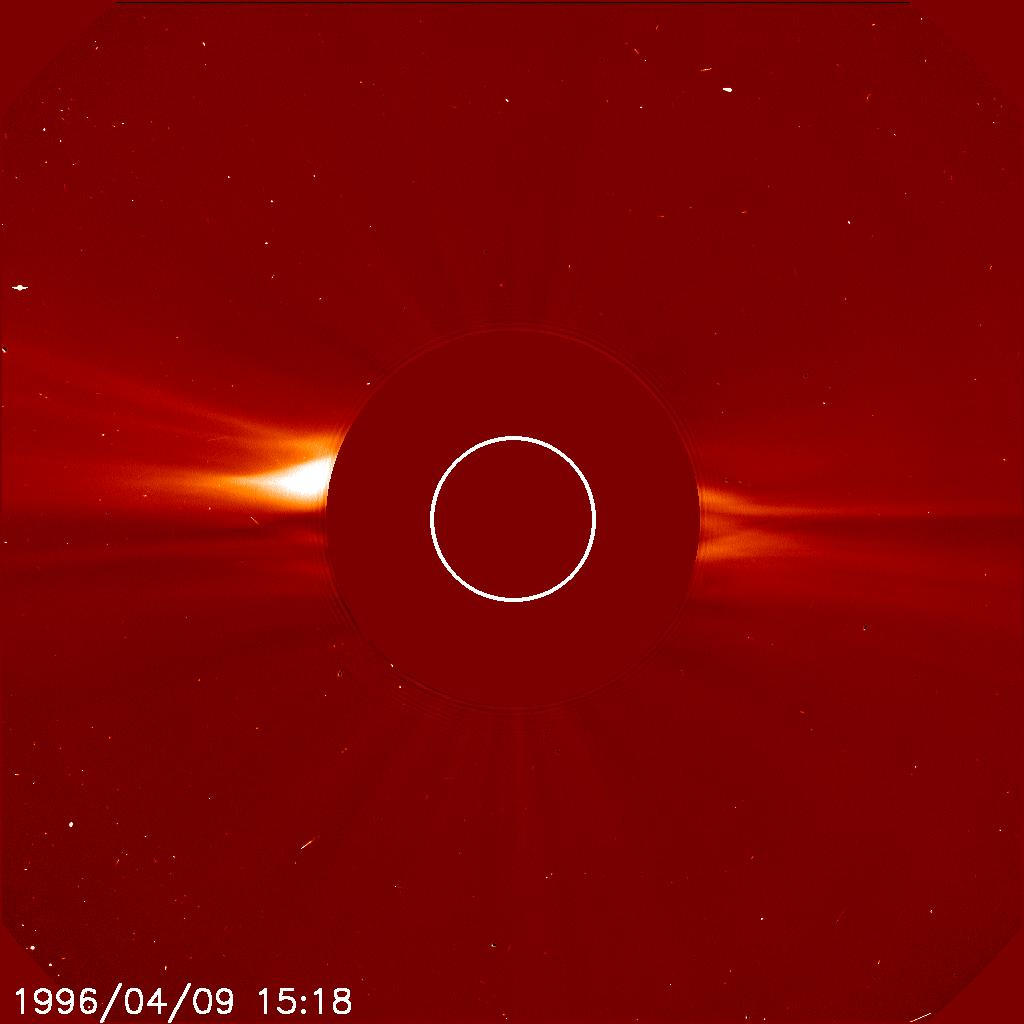
Solar minimum

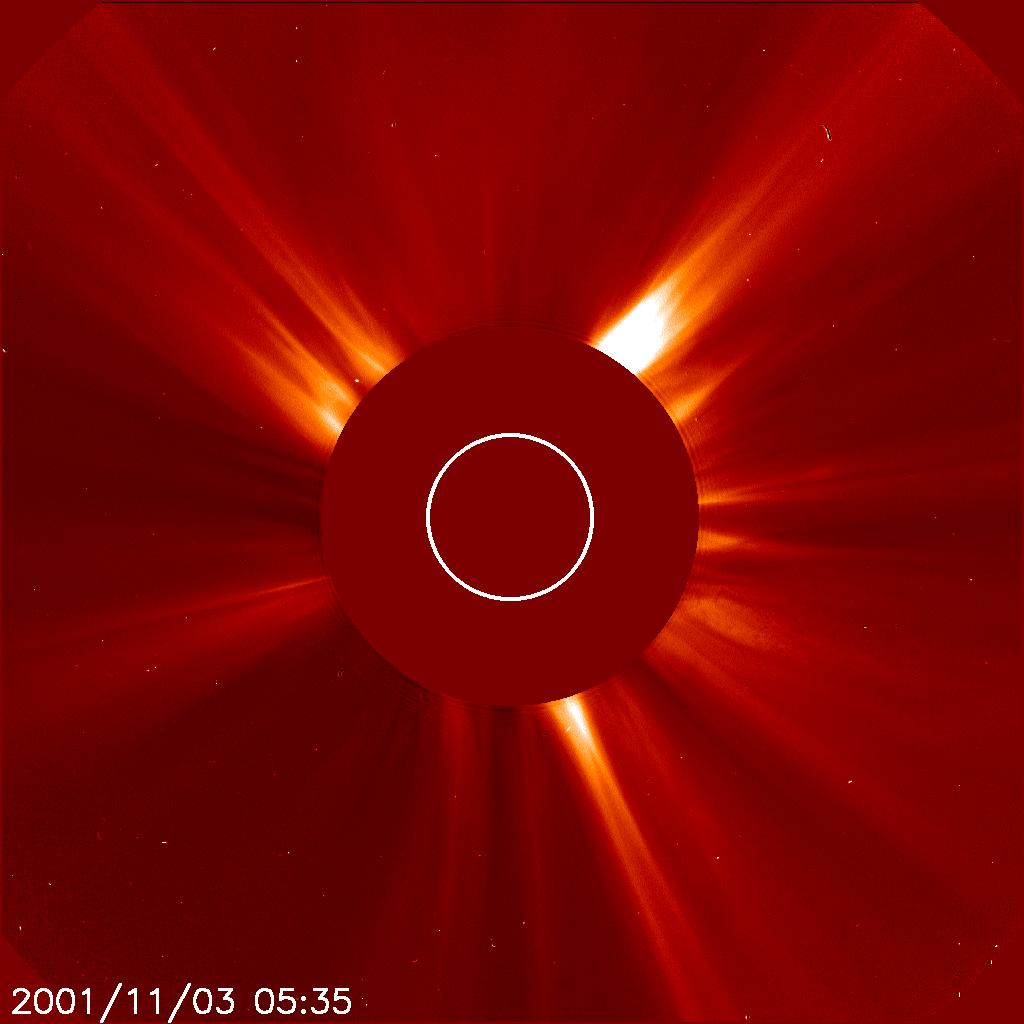
Solar maximum

Coronagraphs taken near the solar minimum between solar cycles 22 and 23 and near the solar maximum of solar cycle 23 demonstrate the different distributions of helmet streamers around the solar disk at different points in a solar cycle.

== Role in coronal mass ejections ==
As Parker Solar Probe passed through the Sun's corona in early 2021, the spacecraft flew by coronal streamers.

Upon the eruption of a coronal mass ejection (CME), the overlying helmet streamer deforms becoming the CME's leading edge. Similarly, the helmet streamer's cavity becomes the CME's cavity and the helmet streamer's prominence becomes the CME's core.

== Pseudostreamers ==
Structures in the corona, similar to a helmet streamer, but connecting holes of the same magnetic polarity, are called pseudostreamers. They were first observed using space-borne coronagraphs and called "plasma sheets" by Hundhausen (1972). They were later renamed to "unipolar streamers" by Zhao & Webb (2003) and then termed "pseudostreamers" by Wang et al. (2007). Pseudostreamers' structure was observed in 2012 by the Solar Dynamics Observatory.

The magnetic topology of pseudostreamers was described as "contain[ing] twin filaments at its base. Such twin filaments are topologically connected, sharing a neutral point and a separatrix dome. This was a case in which two polarity reversal boundaries contain between them fields with a polarity opposite to that of the global unipolar configuration surrounding them (tripolar pseudostreamer)."

Single hybrid magnetic structure that consists of double-streamer/pseudostreamer was observed in the solar corona on May 5-10, 2013 by the SWAP instrument of the PROBA2 satellite. Its structure was described by researchers:

It consists of a pair of filament channels near the south pole of the Sun. On the western edge of the structure, the magnetic morphology above the filaments is that of a side-by-side double streamer, with open field between the two channels. On the eastern edge, the magnetic morphology is that of a coronal pseudostreamer without the central open field.

== See also ==
- List of solar cycles
- Coronal loop
- Solar radio emission
