= Solar sail spacecraft =

Type of spacecraft

Solar sail spacecraft are spacecraft that use large reflective sails to obtain propulsion from the pressure of sunlight. Unlike conventional spacecraft, which rely on chemical rockets or electric propulsion systems, solar sail spacecraft are accelerated by photons emitted by the Sun. Although the force generated by sunlight is very small, it acts continuously and can gradually increase a spacecraft's speed over time.

== History ==
The concept of solar sailing dates back to the early 20th century and was later popularized by writers and scientists such as Konstantin Tsiolkovsky, Friedrich Zander, and Carl Sagan. Solar sails were proposed as a method of long-duration propulsion because they do not require onboard fuel for thrust. Instead, a spacecraft can continue accelerating as long as sunlight reaches the sail.

Solar sail spacecraft generally consist of a central spacecraft bus attached to one or more thin reflective membranes. These sails are commonly made from lightweight materials such as aluminized Mylar or polyimide film. Large sail areas are required because solar radiation pressure is extremely weak compared with rocket thrust. Many solar sail designs use deployable booms to unfold the sail after launch.

Several solar sail spacecraft have been launched. The Japanese spacecraft IKAROS became the first solar sail spacecraft to demonstrate interplanetary propulsion in 2010 during its mission to Venus. Its sail measured about 20 metres in diameter and included thin-film solar cells. NanoSail-D2, launched by NASA in 2010, demonstrated the deployment of a solar sail in Earth orbit. LightSail 2, developed by The Planetary Society, successfully used solar sailing to raise its orbit in 2019.

Solar sail spacecraft have been proposed for a wide variety of missions, including observation of the Sun, exploration of asteroids, and travel to the outer Solar System. Future concepts include laser-propelled sails for interstellar probes and swarms of small sail-powered spacecraft. Because solar sails do not require propellant, they are considered a promising technology for long-duration missions.

== List of solar sail spacecraft ==
- Cosmos 1
- CubeSail
- CubeSail (UltraSail)
- ESTCube-1
- IKAROS
- LightSail
- NanoSail-D
- NanoSail-D2
- Near-Earth Asteroid Scout
- OKEANOS
- Solar Cruiser
- Sunjammer

== See also ==
- Solar sail
- Spacecraft propulsion
- Interstellar probe
