= Icarus (disambiguation) =

Icarus is a character in Greek mythology.

Icarus or Ikarus may also refer to:

== People ==
- Roger Squires (1932–2023), crossword compiler who has used the pseudonym Icarus
- Icarus (wrestler) (born 1982), wrestler with the Chikara organization

== Places ==
- Icarus (island), in the Aegean Sea
- Ikaros (Failaka Island), in the Persian Gulf

== Aviation ==
=== Aircraft ===
- Hartman Ikarus, a 1950s British human-powered ornithopter
- Icarus I, Icarus II and Icarus V, series of rigid-wing hang gliders designed by Taras Kiceniuk, Jr.
- Ikarus C42, a microlight aircraft
- Ikarus IK-2, the most notable indigenous Yugoslav aircraft of the 1930s and World War II era
- Icarus, a prototype space rescue vehicle tested by Aleksandr Serebrov

=== Aviation businesses and organizations ===
- Ikarus Drachen Tomas Pellicci, a German hang glider manufacturer
- Icaro Air, an Ecuadorian airline
- Icarus School, a military aviation academy
- Icarus, a Greek airline that preceded Olympic Airlines
- Ikarus, a Yugoslav aircraft manufacturer later renamed Ikarbus

=== Other uses in aviation ===
- Coupe Icare ("Icarus Cup"), a flight festival

== Other businesses and organizations ==
- Icarus Project, a mental health organization
- Icarus Theatre Collective, a British theatre company
- Ikarus (Hungarian company), a Hungarian bus manufacturer
- Ikarbus, a Serbian bus manufacturer formerly known as Ikarus
- Icarus FC, an association football kit and sportswear brand

== Arts and entertainment ==
=== Film and television ===
- Icarus (Planet of the Apes), a spacecraft in the Planet of the Apes franchise
- Icarus Base, a place in the series Stargate Universe
- Icarus, an orbital superweapon in the James Bond film Die Another Day
- Icarus I, and Icarus II, spacecraft in Sunshine
- Icarus (2010 film) (also The Killing Machine), an action film
- Icarus (2017 film), a documentary by Bryan Fogel
- Icarus (2022 film), an animated fantasy drama
- "Icarus" (Scandal), an episode of the TV series Scandal
- "Icarus", the eleventh episode of Smallville, Season 10
- "Icarus", the seventh episode of Law & Order: Criminal Intent

=== Fictional characters ===
- Icarus (comics), a Marvel Comics character
- Icarus, a mecha in Chōjin Sentai Jetman
- Icarus, a Deus Ex character
- Icarus, in Hercules: The Animated Series
- Icarus, in Little Nemo: Adventures in Slumberland
- Ikaros, in Heaven's Lost Property
- Icarus, a primary character based on the Greek myth in the Cirque du Soleil show Varekai

=== Music ===
==== Albums ====
- Icarus (Paul Winter Consort album), 1972
- Icarus (The Forms album), 2003
- Icarus (Chicosci album), 2004
- Icarus, 2011 EP by Periphery
- Icaro, by Renato Zero
- Icarus (Cryalot EP), 2022
- Icarus, 2024 EP by Khary and Abhi the Nomad

==== Songs ====
- "Icarus", 1969, written by Ralph Towner, included on Icarus (Paul Winter Consort album)
- "Icarus - Borne on Wings of Steel", by Kansas on Masque, 1975
- "Icarus", by Santigold on Top Ranking
- "Icarus", by Jason Webley on Only Just Beginning
- "Ikarus", by Unheilig on Phosphor
- "Icarus", by Bastille on Bad Blood
- "Icarus II", by Kansas on Somewhere to Elsewhere, 2000
- "Icarus", by Eden on vertigo
- "Icarus" (Madeon song), 2012
- "Icarus" (Greeeen song), 2015
- "Icarus" (R3hab song), 2016
- "Icarus", by JJ Project on the EP Verse 2, 2017
- "Icarus", by Emma Blackery from the 2018 album Villains
- "Icarus", by Starset on Horizons, 2021

==== Other uses in music ====
- Icaros, shamanic medicine songs
- Icarus (band), from London, England

=== Other media ===
- Icarus (magazine), a Trinity College student publication
- Icarus (sculpture), 1973 by Michael Ayrton
- Icarus (novel), 2024 novel by K. Ancrum

== Software and video games ==
- Icarus (video game), a sci-fi survival video game developed by RocketWerkz
- Ikarus (typography software), a type design and production software developed by URW foundry
- Ikarus (Scheme implementation), a free software optimizing incremental compiler for R6RS Scheme
- Icarus Verilog, an implementation of the Verilog hardware description language
- BioShock Infinite, codenamed "Project Icarus" during development
- Ikarus (chess), a computer chess program
- IKARUS (debugger), the debugger of the Pegasos computer

== Science and technology ==
=== Space ===
- 1566 Icarus, an asteroid
- ICARUS experiment, a neutrino detector at Gran Sasso National Laboratory, Italy
- Icarus (crater), on the Moon, named for the Ralph Towner composition by the Apollo 15 Astronauts
- Icarus (journal), a planetary science journal
- Icarus (star), most distant individual star detected (as of April 2018)
- IKAROS, an interplanetary uncrewed solar sail spacecraft
- Project Icarus (interstellar), a design study of an interstellar spacecraft based on Project Daedalus
- Project Icarus (photography) (2009), a project at the Massachusetts Institute of Technology (MIT)

=== Other uses in science and technology ===
- Icarus (plant), a fern genus
- ICARUS Initiative, an international project studying the migration routes of flying animals
- IKZF1, a protein in humans that is encoded by the IKZF genes of the Ikaros family zinc finger group

== Other uses ==
- HMS Icarus, the name of several ships
- USCGC Icarus (WPC-110), a patrol boat of the US Coast Guard
- USCGC Icarus (WMSM-920), a Heritage-class cutter of the US Coast Guard
- Ikarus, a restaurant in Hangar-7 in Salzburg, Austria
- Icarus affair, an incident involving the 1867 murder of two British sailors in Nagasaki
- Operation Ikarus, a World War II German plan to invade Iceland

== See also ==
- Project Icarus (disambiguation)
- Icaros (disambiguation)
- Ikaros (disambiguation)
- Ikaris, a Marvel Comics character
  - Ikaris (Marvel Cinematic Universe), the Marvel Cinematic Universe adaptation
