= OKEANOS =

Proposed space probe to Trojan asteroids

- Names: Oversize Kite-craft for Exploration and Astronautics in the Outer Solar system Jupiter Trojan Asteroid Explorer
- Mission type: Technology demonstration, Reconnaissance, Possible sample return
- Operator: JAXA
- Mission duration: ≈12 years >30 years for optional sample return

Spacecraft properties
- Spacecraft type: Solar sail
- Manufacturer: ISAS and DLR
- Launch mass: 1400 kg
- Landing mass: ≈100 kg
- Payload mass: Spacecraft: 30 kg Lander: 20 kg
- Dimensions: Sail/solar panel: 40×40 m (1600 m^{2}); Lander: 65 × 40 cm
- Power: Max: 5 kW at Jupiter

Start of mission
- Launch date: 2026
- Rocket: H-IIA or H3
- Launch site: Tanegashima Space Center
- Contractor: Mitsubishi Heavy Industries

Jupiter Trojan lander
- Landing date: 2039

Main telescope
- Wavelengths: Infrared

Transponders
- Band: X-band
- Capacity: 16 Kbps
- Large Mission Class

OKEANOS (Oversize Kite-craft for Exploration and Astronautics in the Outer Solar system) was a proposed mission concept to Trojan asteroids, which share Jupiter's orbit, using a hybrid solar sail for propulsion; the sail was planned to be covered with thin solar panels to power an ion engine. In situ analysis of the collected samples would have been performed by either direct contact or using a lander carrying a high-resolution mass spectrometer. A sample-return to Earth was an option under study.

OKEANOS was a finalist for Japan's Institute of Space and Astronautical Science (ISAS)' 2nd Large Mission Class to be launched in 2026, and possibly return Trojan asteroid samples to Earth in the 2050s. The winning mission was LiteBIRD.

== Overview ==
The OKEANOS mission was a concept first proposed in 2010 to fly together with the Jupiter Magnetospheric Orbiter (JMO) as part of the cancelled Europa Jupiter System Mission – Laplace.

In its latest formulation, the OKEANOS mission and LiteBIRD were the two finalists of Japan's Large Mission Class by the Ministry of Education, Culture, Sports, Science and Technology. LiteBIRD, a cosmic microwave background astronomy telescope, was selected.

Analyzing the composition of the Jupiter Trojans may help scientists understand how the Solar System was formed. It would also help determine which of the competing formation hypotheses is right: remnant planetesimals during the formation of Jupiter, or fossils of building blocks of Jupiter, or captured trans-Neptunian objects by planetary migration. The latest proposal included a lander to perform in situ analyses. There were several options for this mission, and the most ambitious one proposed to retrieve and send samples to Earth for extensive investigations. Had it been selected in April 2019 for development, the spacecraft would have launched in 2026, and may had offered some synergy with Lucy spacecraft that will flyby multiple Jupiter Trojans in 2027.

== Spacecraft ==
The spacecraft was projected to have a mass of about 1,285 kg (2,833 lb) including a possible lander and would have been equipped with solar electric ion engines. The 1600 m^{2} sail would have had a dual purpose of solar sail propulsion and solar panel for power generation. If a lander had been included, its mass would have been no greater than 100 kg. The lander would have collected and analyzed samples from the asteroid. A more complex suggested concept would have had the lander take off again, rendezvous with the mothership and transfer the samples for their transport to Earth.

=== Solar sail and solar panels ===
The unique proposed sail was a hybrid that would have provided both photon propulsion and electric power. JAXA referred to the system as a Solar Power Sail. The sail would have been made of a 10 μm-thick polyimide film measuring 40 × 40 meters (1600 m^{2}), covered with 30,000 solar panels 25 μm thick, capable of generating up to 5 kW at the distance of Jupiter, 5.2 Astronomical Units from the Sun. The main spacecraft would have been located at the center of the sail, equipped with a solar-electric ion engine for maneuvering and propulsion, especially for a possible sample-return trip to Earth.

The spacecraft would have used solar sail technology initially developed for the successful IKAROS (Interplanetary Kite-craft Accelerated by Radiation of the Sun) that launched in 2010, whose solar sail was 14 m × 14 m in size. As with the IKAROS, the solar angle of the sail would have been changed by dynamically controlling the reflectivity of liquid crystal displays (LCD) on the outer edge of the sail so that the sunlight pressure would produce torque to change its orientation.

=== Ion engine ===
The ion engine intended for the mission was called μ10 HIsp. It was planned to have a specific impulse of 10,000 seconds, power of 2.5 kW, and a maximum thrust magnitude of 27 mN for each of the four engines. The electric engine system would have been an improved version of the engine from the Hayabusa mission, used for maneuvering, and especially for an optional sample-return trip to Earth. A study indicated the need for 191 kg of xenon propellant if it had been decided to bring a sample back to Earth.

=== Lander ===
Lander	Parameter/units
Mass	≤ 100 kg (220 lb)
Dimensions	Cylindrical: 65 cm diameter 40 cm height
Power	Non-rechargeable battery
Instruments (≤ 20 kg)	Panoramic camera (visible and infrared); infrared microscope; Raman spectrometer; magnetometer; Thermal radiometer
Sampling	Pneumatic; Depth: ≤1 m

The mission concept considered several scenarios, targets, and architectures. The most ambitious scenario contemplated in situ analysis and a sample-return using a lander. This lander concept was a collaboration among the German Aerospace Center (DLR) and Japan's JAXA, starting in 2014. The spacecraft would have deployed a 100 kg lander on the surface of a 20–30 km Trojan asteroid to analyze its subsurface volatile constituents, such as water ice, using a 1-meter pneumatic drill powered by pressurized nitrogen gas. Some subsurface samples would have been transferred to the on board mass spectrometer for volatile analysis. The lander's scientific payload mass, including the sampling system, would not have exceeded 20 kg. The lander would have been powered by batteries and was planned to perform an autonomous descent, landing, sampling and analysis. Some samples were to be heated up to 1000 °C for pyrolysis for isotopic analysis. The conceptual payload for the lander would have included a panoramic camera (visible and infrared), an infrared microscope, a Raman spectrometer, a magnetometer, and a thermal radiometer. The lander would have operated for about 20 hours using battery power.

If a sample-return was to be performed, the lander would have taken off then, rendezvous and deliver the surface and subsurface samples to the mothership hovering above (at 50 km) for subsequent delivery to Earth within a reentry capsule. The lander would have been discarded after the sample transfer.

== Conceptual scientific payload ==
On the lander

- Mass spectrometer
- Hyperspectral microscope
- Hyperspectral panoramic imager
- Optical navigation camera
- Laser rangefinder
- Fluxgate 3-axis magnetometer
- Alpha particle X-ray spectrometer (APXS)
- Surface and subsurface sampler

On the spacecraft

- Exo-Zodiacal Infrared Telescope (EXZIT) is a 10 cm-diameter telescope.
- Gamma-ray burst polarimeter (GAP-2)
- Monostatic radar to image the body's internal structures

Attached to the sail

- Arrayed Large-area Dust Detectors (ALDN-2)
- Magnetic Field Experiment (MGF-2) is a fluxgate magnetometer

GAP-2 and EXZIT were instruments for astronomical observations, and were not intended to be used for studying Trojan asteroids. The two would have conducted opportunistic surveys, taking advantage of the mission's trajectory. GAP-2 would have made it possible to locate the position of Gamma-ray bursts with high precision by pairing it with terrestrial observatories. EXZIT, as zodiacal light gets significantly weak beyond the asteroid belt, would have enabled the telescope to observe the cosmic infrared background. MGF-2 was a possible a successor of the MGF instrument on board the Arase satellite, and ALADDIN-2, GAP-2 were possible successors of the respective instruments onboard IKAROS.

== See also ==
- CubeSail – Planned solar sail spacecraft
- DESTINY^{+} – Planned asteroid flyby mission by JAXA, using solar electric propulsion
- IKAROS – First interplanetary solar sail spacecraft
- LightSail 2 – LEO solar sailing demo project
- Lucy (spacecraft)
- NanoSail-D2 – Satellite designed to test concept of solar sails
- Near-Earth Asteroid Scout – Solar sail spacecraft
- Lunar Flashlight – Lunar orbiter by NASA
