= Project Icarus =

Project Icarus may refer to:

- Project Icarus (interstellar), a study started in 2009 for the design of an interstellar space probe
- Project Icarus (photography), a 2009 Massachusetts Institute of Technology photography project
- 1566 Icarus#Project Icarus, a 1967 MIT student project to defend against risks from the asteroid 1566 Icarus
- "Project Icarus", the working title of the 2013 Irrational Games video game BioShock Infinite
- Icarus Project, a former network of mental health peer-support groups

== See also ==
- Icarus (disambiguation)
