= Ikaros =

Ikaros may refer to:

- IKAROS, a Japanese spacecraft
- Ikaros (island), an island in the Aegean Sea
- Ikaros (Failaka Island), an ancient Greek city in the Persian Gulf
- Ikaros (mythology), a figure in Greek mythology
- Ikaros, a character in Heaven's Lost Property
- Ikaros, a transcription factor encoded by the human IKZF1 gene

== See also ==
- Icarus (disambiguation)
