= STS-77 =

1996 American crewed spaceflight

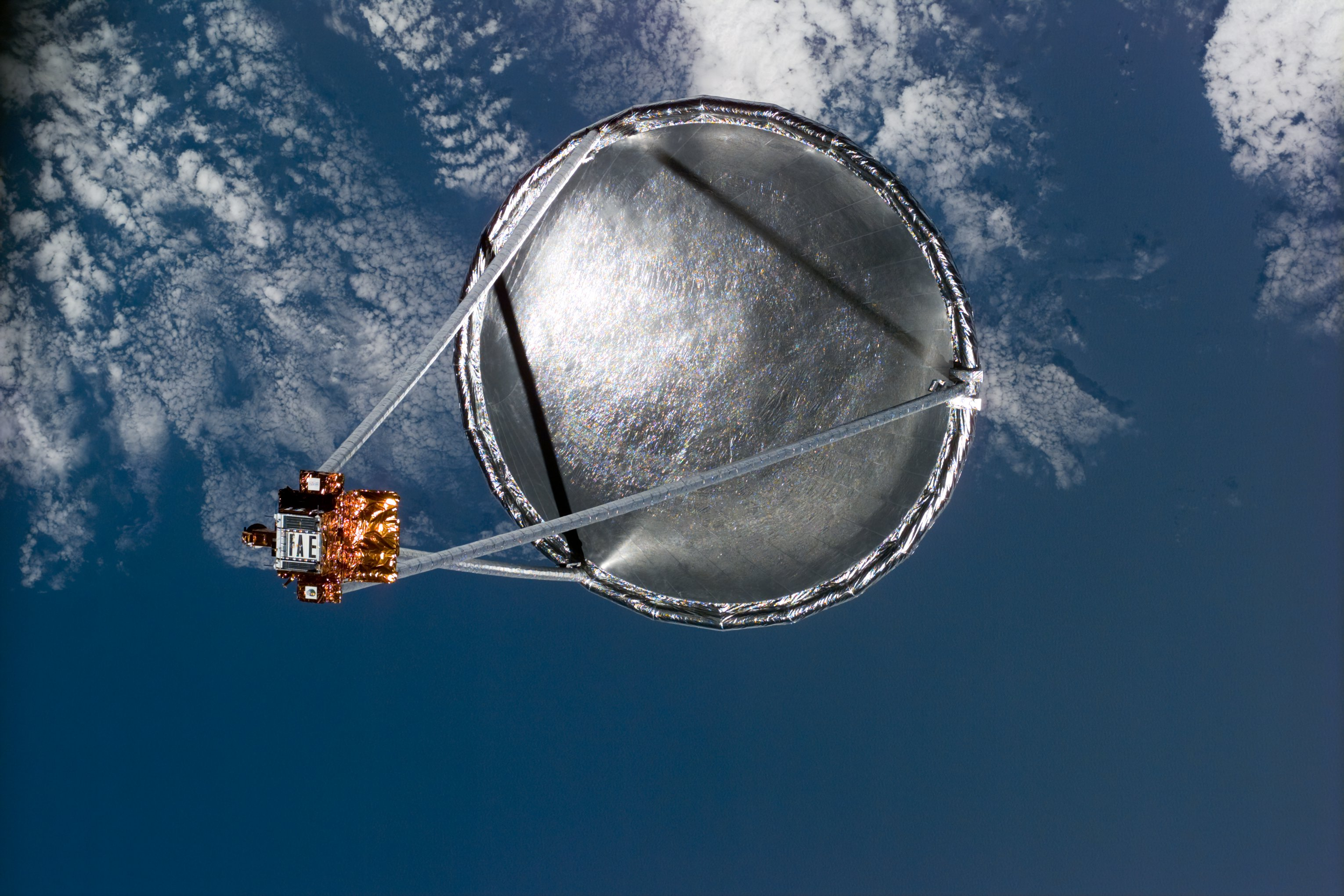
- The Inflatable Antenna Experiment in free flight
- Mission type: Microgravity research
- Operator: NASA
- COSPAR ID: 1996-032A
- SATCAT no.: 23870
- Mission duration: 10 days, 40 minutes, 10 seconds
- Distance travelled: 6,600,000 kilometres (4,100,000 mi)
- Orbits completed: 161

Spacecraft properties
- Spacecraft: Space Shuttle Endeavour
- Launch mass: 115,456 kilograms (254,537 lb)
- Landing mass: 92,701 kilograms (204,371 lb)
- Payload mass: 12,233 kilograms (26,969 lb)

Crew
- Crew size: 6
- Members: John H. Casper; Curtis L. Brown, Jr.; Andrew S. Thomas; Daniel W. Bursch; Mario Runco, Jr.; Marc Garneau

Start of mission
- Launch date: 19 May 1996, 10:30:00.066 UTC
- Launch site: Kennedy, LC-39B

End of mission
- Landing date: 29 May 1996, 11:09:18 UTC
- Landing site: Kennedy, SLF Runway 33

Orbital parameters
- Reference system: Geocentric
- Regime: Low Earth
- Perigee altitude: 278 kilometres (173 mi)
- Apogee altitude: 287 kilometres (178 mi)
- Inclination: 39.0 degrees
- Period: 90.1 min
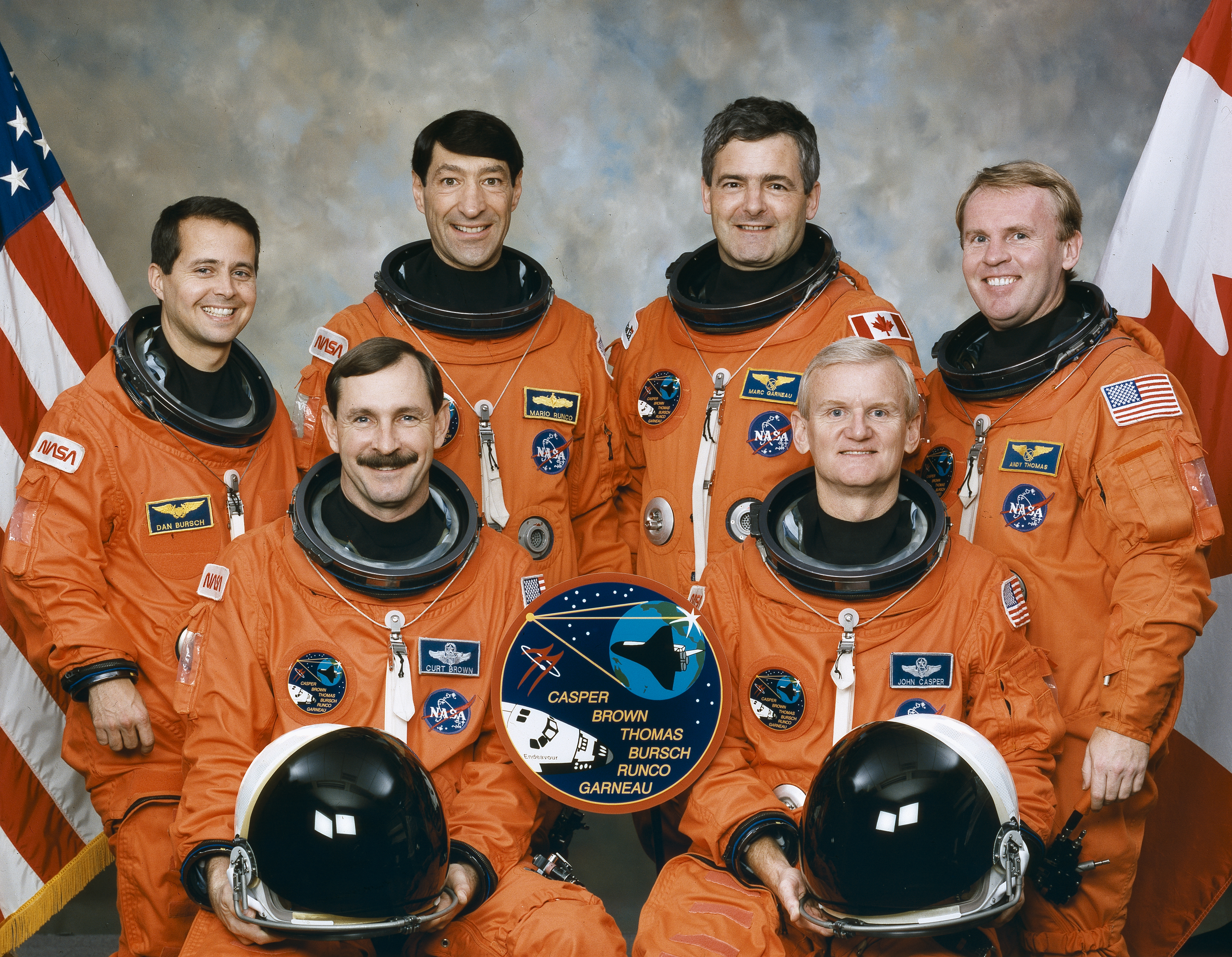
- Left to right – Seated: Brown, Casper; Standing, Bursch, Runco, Garneau, Thomas Space Shuttle program

STS-77 was the 77th Space Shuttle mission and the 11th mission of the Space Shuttle Endeavour. The mission began from launch pad 39B from Kennedy Space Center, Florida on 19 May 1996 lasting 10 days and 40 minutes and completing 161 revolutions before landing on runway 33. The defense and aerospace technology company L'Garde was responsible for the design and manufacture of the Antenna in the Inflatable Antenna Experiment, a key component of the STS-77 mission.

== Crew ==
Position	Astronaut
Commander	(United States) John H. Casper; Fourth and last spaceflight
Pilot	(United States) Curtis L. Brown, Jr. Third spaceflight
Mission Specialist 1	(Australia) / (United States) Andrew S. Thomas; First spaceflight
Mission Specialist 2 Flight Engineer	(United States) Daniel W. Bursch; Third spaceflight
Mission Specialist 3	(United States) Mario Runco, Jr. Third and last spaceflight
Mission Specialist 4	(Canada) Marc Garneau, CSA; Second spaceflight

=== Crew seat assignments ===
Seat	Launch	Landing	Seats 1–4 are on the flight deck. Seats 5–7 are on the mid-deck.
1	Casper		Seats 1–4 are on the flight deck. Seats 5–7 are on the mid-deck.
2	Brown		Seats 1–4 are on the flight deck. Seats 5–7 are on the mid-deck.
3	Thomas	Runco	Seats 1–4 are on the flight deck. Seats 5–7 are on the mid-deck.
4	Bursch		Seats 1–4 are on the flight deck. Seats 5–7 are on the mid-deck.
5	Runco	Thomas	Seats 1–4 are on the flight deck. Seats 5–7 are on the mid-deck.
6	Garneau		Seats 1–4 are on the flight deck. Seats 5–7 are on the mid-deck.

== Mission highlights ==
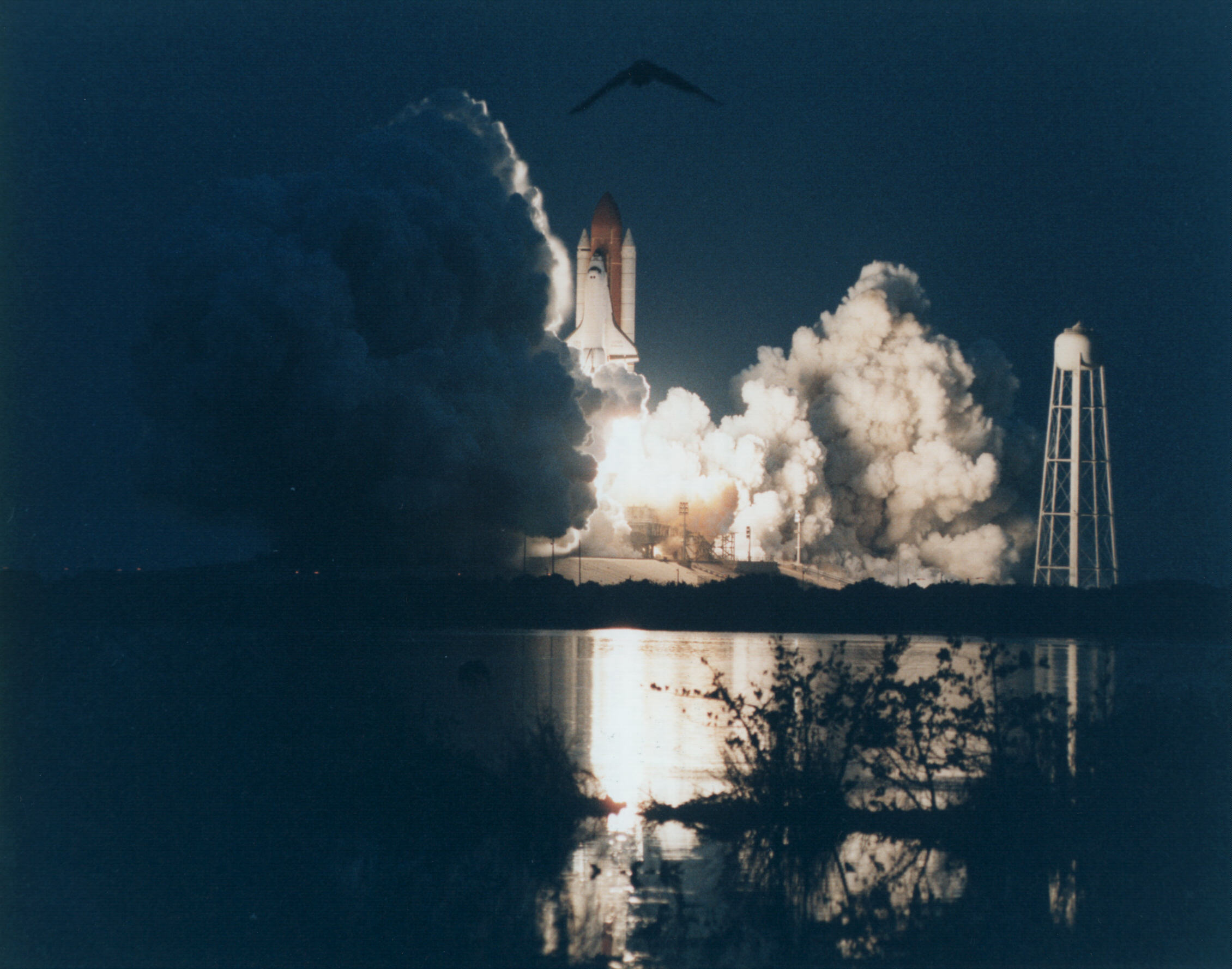
Launch of STS-77

NASA's flight of shuttle Endeavour was devoted to opening the commercial space frontier. During the flight the crew performed microgravity research aboard the commercially owned and operated SPACEHAB module. The mission also deployed and retrieved the Spartan-207/IAE (Inflatable Antenna Experiment) satellite and rendezvoused with a test satellite. A suite of four technology experiments known as the Technology Experiments for Advancing Missions in Space (TEAMS) also flew in the Shuttle's payload bay.

The SPACEHAB single module carried nearly 1,400 kilograms (3,100 lb) of experiments and support equipment for 12 commercial space product development payloads in the areas of biotechnology, electronic materials, polymers and agriculture as well as several experiments for other NASA payload organizations. One of these, the Commercial Float Zone Facility (CFZF) was developed through international collaboration between the U.S., Canada, and Germany. It heated various samples of electronic and semiconductor material through the float-zone technique. Another facility on SPACEHAB was the Space Experiment Facility (SEF) which grew crystals by vapor diffusion.

The Goddard Space Flight Center's (GSFC) Spartan-207 satellite was used to deploy and test the Inflatable Antenna Experiment (IAE) which laid the groundwork for future technology development in inflatable space structures. It tested the performance of a large inflatable antenna during a ninety-minute mission. The antenna structure was then jettisoned and the SPARTAN-207 spacecraft recovered at mission end.

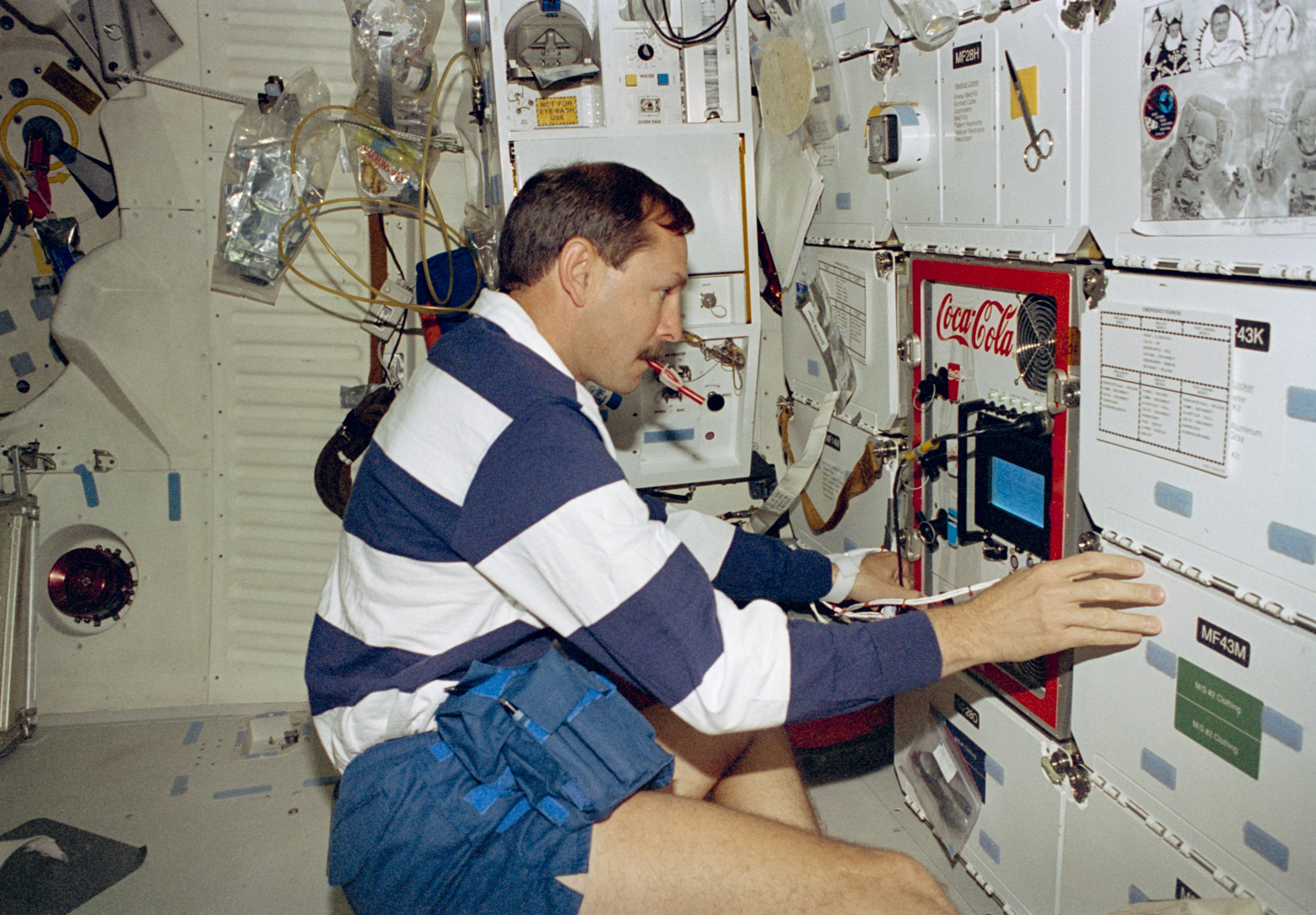
Pilot Curtis Brown prepares to activate the Fluids Generic Bioprocessing Apparatus (FGBA) 2, on the middeck.

Inside Endeavour's cargo bay the four TEAMS experiments operated throughout the mission. They included the Global Positioning System (GPS) Attitude and Navigation Experiment (GANE) to determine to what accuracy the GPS system can supply attitude information to a space vehicle; the Vented Tank Resupply Experiment (VTRE) to test improved methods for in-space refueling; the Liquid Metal Thermal Experiment (LMTE) to evaluate the performance of liquid metal heat pipes in microgravity conditions, and the Passive Aerodynamically Stabilized Magnetically Damped Satellite (PAMS) payload to demonstrate the technology of the principle of aerodynamic stabilization in the upper atmosphere. Cameras on the shuttle recorded the PAMS satellite as it was deployed and tracked its movements.

Secondary experiments on the flight included the Brilliant Eyes Ten Kelvin Sorption Cryocooler Experiment (BETSCE), the Aquatic Research Facility (ARF) and the Biological Research In a Canister (BRIC) experiment.

Also onboard was the Plant-Generic Bioprocessing Apparatus (P-GBA) designed by BioServe Space Technologies. Several plant species were flown in this double middeck locker configurated plant growth chamber. Investigations on plant growth in micro-gravity as well as research on the feasibility of agriculture in space were successfully carried out.

A Coca-Cola fountain dispenser (officially a Fluids Generic Bioprocessing Apparatus-2 or FGBA-2) was developed for use on STS-77 as a test bed to determine if carbonated beverages can be produced from separately stored carbon dioxide, water and flavored syrups and determine if the resulting fluids can be made available for consumption without bubble nucleation and resulting foam formation. The unit held 1.65 liters (0.36 imp gal; 0.44 U.S. gal) each of Coca-Cola and Diet Coke. The original FGBA flew on STS-63.

== Mission insignia ==
The two red portions of the NASA logo on the left of the insignia symbolize the flight's numerical designation in the Space Transportation System's mission sequence.

== See also ==
- List of human spaceflights
- List of human spaceflights to Mir
- List of Space Shuttle missions
- Outline of space science
