= PowerFilm =

PowerFilm, Inc.
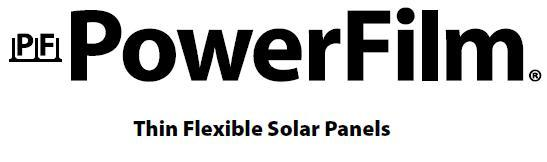
- Company type: Public company (LSE: PFLM)
- Industry: Renewable Energy
- Founded: 1988 (as Iowa Thin Film Technologies Inc.)
- Founder: Dr. Frank Jeffrey; Dr. Derrick Grimmer
- Headquarters: U.S.
- Key people: Dr. Frank Jeffrey, (Chairman, CEO); Dr. Dan Stieler (President); Kip Johnson (VP Marketing & Sales); Jeff Anderson (VP Operations); Brad Scandrett (VP Engineering)
- Products: [[custom solar solution] [solar panels]]
- Revenue: ▼US $10,333,926 (2012)
- Net income: ▲US -$701,802 (2012)
- Website: www.powerfilmsolar.com
- Footnotes / references Financials from PowerFilm 2012 Annual Report

PowerFilm, Inc. is a manufacturer of flexible thin film solar photovoltaic (PV) modules, or solar panels, based in Ames, Iowa and is a provider of solar products for industrial, consumer and military remote power applications. PowerFilm's amorphous silicon (a-Si) thin-film solar modules are both built into solar charger products as well as sold to OEM integrators.

== Technology ==
CEO Frank Jeffrey summarizes PowerFilm technology for the podcast interview The Naked Scientists "The principal part of the solar cell itself in our cells is amorphous a silicon, which has an extremely high absorption coefficient so that we can have extremely thin semiconducting material that will still absorb a good portion of light. That thin material, even though if it were thick like a crystalline wafer, it would break, in the same type structure when it’s thin enough becomes flexible and tends to bend rather than break. So, that’s the key part, our basic absorber layer that absorbs the solar energy is only say, 5,000 angstroms thick. So it’s quite thin and flexible and we put it on a thin film plastic substrate that is also flexible and adds mechanical support and strength to the solar component." Materials used in thin film absorb more light than traditional silicon cells and therefore can be made much thinner than crystalline cells (1 vs. 200 micrometres)

Season 25 Episode 1 (4/2/15) of How It's Made shows the manufacture of the PowerFilm panels.

== History ==
- In 1983, thin film roll-to-roll solar cell research began at 3M. Research physicists Dr. Frank Jeffrey and Dr. Derrick Grimmer left 3M and founded Iowa Thin Film Technologies which then engaged in a partnership with 3M and Iowa State University.
- In 1988, Iowa Thin Film Technologies broke ties from 3M and the company began working in a Department of Energy lab in Ames, Iowa.
- The company's first thin-film solar product was created in 1995.
- In 1999, the company shipped thousands of solar panels due in large part to the "Y2K" scare. This resulted in the company's first profitable year.
- 2005: $3.2M contract announced to develop solar tent structures for the U.S. Army
- 2007: Company goes public on the London stock exchange under the name PowerFilm, Inc. IPO ticker symbol PFLM
- 2008: Manufacturing plant expanded by 80,000 sq ft to accommodate additional production capability
- 2010: Japan launches IKAROS. The Japan Aerospace Exploration Agency used PowerFilm Inc. photovoltaic thin film in the world’s first solar sail powered deep space satellite.
- 2012: U.S. Army makes $3M PowerFilm foldable solar panel purchase

== Products ==
- OEM thin film solar components
- Foldable solar chargers
- Rollable solar chargers
- Military solar products
- USB solar chargers

== Awards ==
- FLEXI Award
- Prometheus 2010 Technology Company of the Year
- Technology Association of Iowa Clean Tech Company of the Year
