= Sunjammer (spacecraft) =

NASA mission intended to demonstrate a solar sail constructed by LGarde

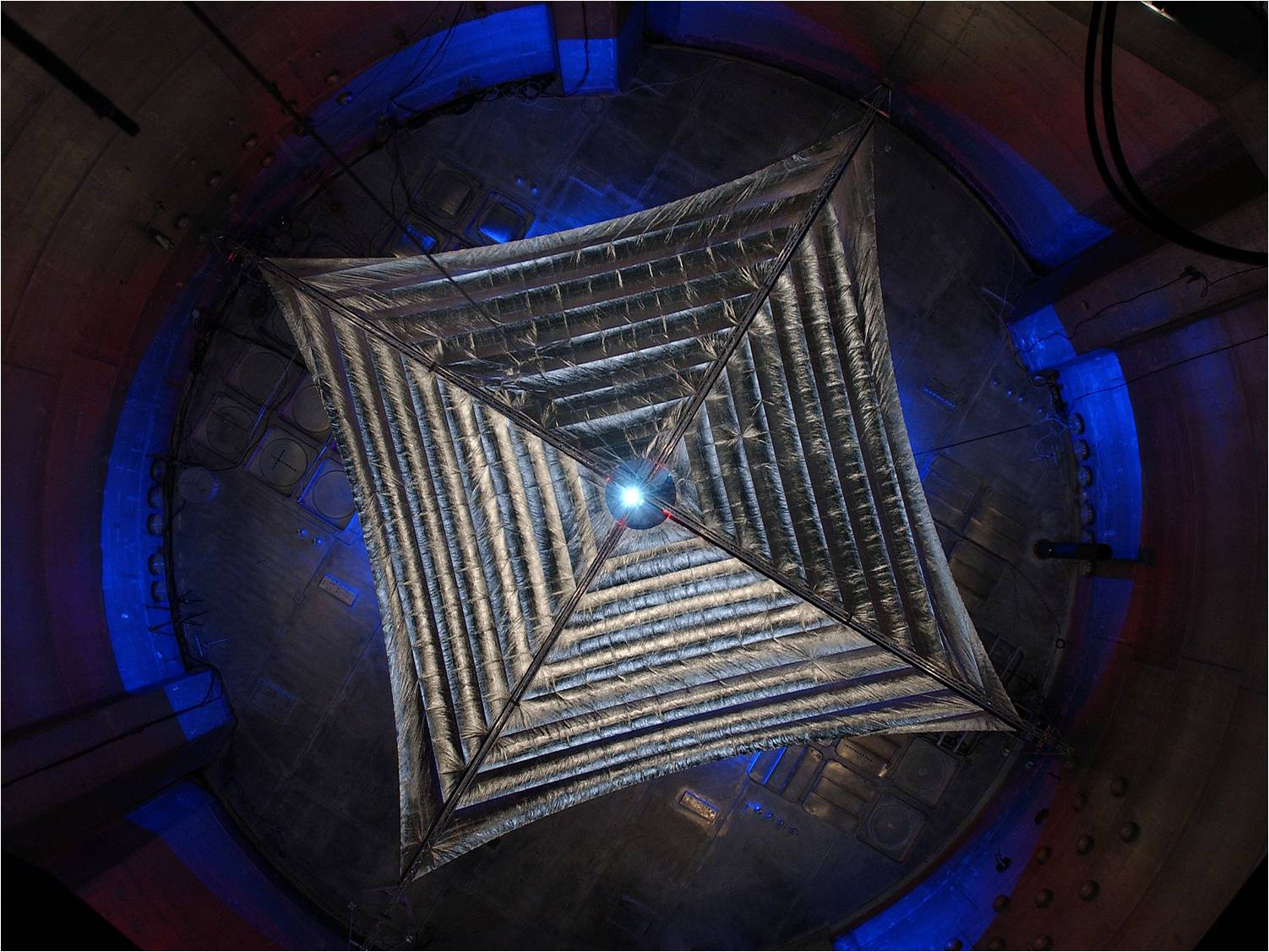
- Sunjammer as seen from the top of the vacuum chamber where it was tested.
- Names: Solar Sail Demonstrator
- Mission type: Technology demonstration
- Operator: NASA
- Website: The Sunjammer Project

Spacecraft properties
- Manufacturer: LGarde
- Launch mass: 32 kg (71 lb)
- Dimensions: 38 m × 38 m (125 ft × 125 ft)

Start of mission
- Launch date: Canceled (planned for January 2015)
- Rocket: Falcon 9
- Launch site: Cape Canaveral Air Force Station
- Contractor: SpaceX

Orbital parameters
- Reference system: Geocentric orbit (planned)
- Regime: Low Earth orbit

Sunjammer (Solar Sail Demonstrator) was a NASA mission intended to demonstrate a solar sail constructed by LGarde, but was canceled before launch. The largest solar sail made as of 2013, Sunjammer was named after a 1964 Arthur C. Clarke story of the same name, Sunjammer, in which several solar sails compete in a race to the Moon. Sunjammer was slated to launch in January 2015 as the secondary payload of a SpaceX Falcon 9 launch vehicle, along with the Earth observation satellite DSCOVR. Citing a lack of confidence in its contractor's ability to deliver, the mission was canceled in October 2014.

== Spacecraft design ==
Constructed of Kapton in order to withstand the extreme temperatures of space, Sunjammer has a width and height of 38 m (125 ft), giving it a total surface area of over 1,200 m^{2} (13,000 sq ft) and making it the largest solar sail as of 2013. Despite its huge surface area, Sunjammer has a thickness of only 5 μm, giving it an extremely low weight of about 32 kg (71 lb) and allowing it to be stored in a space the size of a dishwasher. Once in space, the large surface area of the solar sail would allow it to achieve a thrust of about 0.01 N and a characteristic acceleration of about 0.25 mm/s^{2}. To control its orientation, and via this its speed and direction, Sunjammer was to use gimballed vanes (each of which is itself a small solar sail) located at the tips of each of its 4 booms, instead of thrusters, eliminating the need for any propellant other than the rays of the Sun.

In addition to being a demonstration craft, Sunjammer was to collect scientific data in its own right. With several instruments to detect various aspects of space weather, Sunjammer could have eventually become part of a larger network of solar sails studying the Sun, allowing for the creation of a more robust early-warning system for space weather.

== Mission ==
Prior to its cancellation, Sunjammer was slated for launch in January 2015 aboard a Falcon 9 launch vehicle, a slight delay from an earlier projection of November 2014. It was to launch as a secondary payload along with the primary DSCOVR Earth observation and space weather satellite. Within two months of launch the spacecraft was to test various technologies, such as deployment, vector control via altitude vanes, and eventually reaching a location near the Earth-Sun L1 Lagrange point.

== Payloads ==
Sunjammer was to carry two British space science payloads: the Solar Wind Analyser (SWAN) developed by the Mullard Space Science Laboratory of University College London, and the MAGIC magnetometer developed by the Blackett Laboratory of Imperial College London.

Sunjammer was to carry a Celestis Memorial Spaceflight payload of cremated remains.

== See also ==
- CubeSail
- CubeSail (UltraSail)
- IKAROS, a Japanese solar sail, launched in May 2010
- LightSail, a controlled solar sail CubeSat to launch in 2018
- NanoSail-D2, the successor to NanoSail-D, launched in November 2010
- Near-Earth Asteroid Scout, a solar sail CubeSat planned to launch in 2022
