= Icara =

Icara may refer to:

- İcarə, Azerbaijan
- Içara, Brazil
- International Child Abduction Remedies Act, International Child Abduction Remedies Act

== See also ==
- Icaro (disambiguation)
