= Icaros =

Icaros may refer to:

- Icaros, medicine songs
- Icaros (album), the fifth album from Diablo_(band)
- Icaros (mythology), a character in Greek mythology
- Icaros Desktop, a distribution of the AROS Research Operating System

== See also ==
- Icarus (disambiguation)
- Icaro (disambiguation)
