= Icaro (disambiguation) =

Icaro (Quechua: ikaro) is a South American indigenous colloquialism for magic song.

Icaro may also refer to:

- CV Ícaro, previous name of Club 15-15, a Spanish women's professional volleyball team
- Icaro (manga), a 1997 Japanese manga series by Moebius and Jiro Taniguchi
- Icaro 2000, an Italian aircraft manufacturer, including a list of aircraft
- Icaro Air, a former airline based in Quito, Ecuador
- "Icaro", a song by Chana from the 2008 EP Manos Arriba
- Ícaro Oliveira (born 1984), Brazilian football striker
- Ícaro (footballer, born 1989), Ícaro do Carmo Silva, Brazilian football centre-back
- Ícaro (footballer, born 1993), Ícaro Cosmo da Rocha, Brazilian football defensive midfielder

== See also ==
- Icara (disambiguation)
- Icaros (disambiguation)
