= Inflatable Antenna Experiment =

1996 inflatable satellite experiment

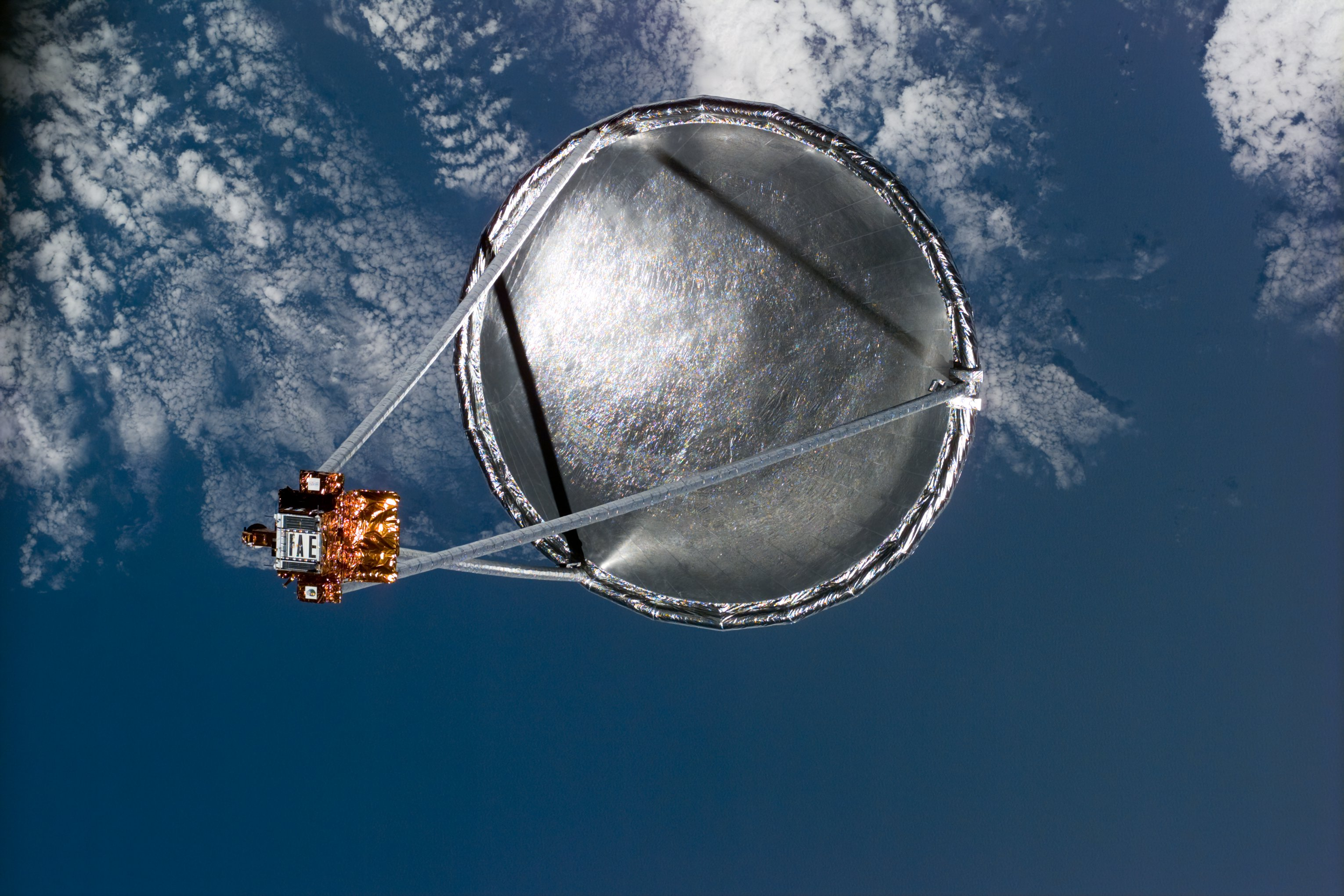
The deployed Inflatable Antenna Experiment

The Inflatable Antenna Experiment (IAE) was a NASA experiment that began on May 19, 1996, consisting of an inflatable antenna made of mylar which was launched from the Space Shuttle Endeavour during the 1996 STS-77 mission, in cooperation with the satellite Spartan-207.

The deployment of the antenna did not go as planned due to "residual air in the stowed structure and a significant amount of strain energy release from the torus structure" leading to unexpected rotation but ultimately the correct shape. Later the deployed antenna was separated from the Spartan-207 spacecraft before re-entering Earth's atmosphere a few days later, on 22 May. The Spartan-207 spacecraft was retrieved and returned to earth on the Endeavour. IAE was intended to pave the way for the development of lightweight inflatable structures for space applications. The IAE was constructed by LGarde, Inc., an American aerospace company based in Orange County, CA.
