= LGarde =

American aerospace and defense technology company

L.Garde, Inc.
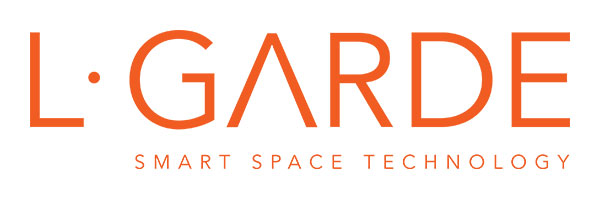
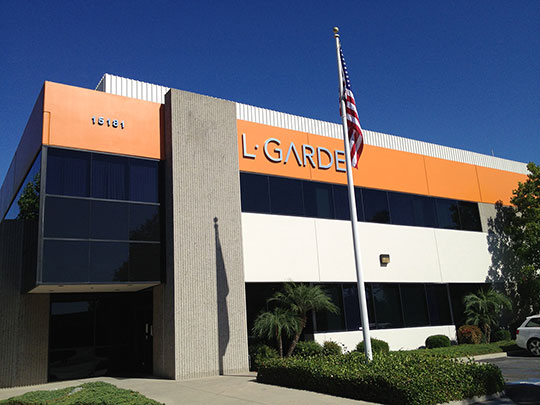
- Company type: Private Company
- Industry: Aerospace
- Founded: 1971
- Founders: Bill Larkin, Gayle Bilyeu, Alan Hirasuna, Rick Walstrom, Don Davis
- Headquarters: 15181 Woodlawn Ave, Tustin, CA 92780
- Area served: Worldwide
- Products: Deployable Antennas, Space Propulsion, Space Structures, Missile Defense Targets and Countermeasures
- Website: www.lgarde.com

LGarde, also L'Garde or L·Garde, is an American aerospace and defense technology company founded in 1971 in Orange County, CA and is the primary contractor for the Sunjammer spacecraft, the world largest solar sail. The company was an early pioneer of thin-skinned, multi-task inflatable structures used in various military and space applications. At the height of the Cold War, L·Garde developed and manufactured inflatable targets and decoy systems for U.S. military defense, and countermeasure systems for the Strategic Defense Initiative (Star Wars). After the Cold-War, the company used the technologies and manufacturing techniques it had developed to land a contract to design and build the inflatable antenna experiment and other thin-film inflatable space structures using its unique application of rigidizable tube technology. The company's unusual name is an acronym formed by the initials of the founding partners: Bill Larkin, Gayle Bilyeu, Alan Hirasuna, Rich Walstrom, Don Davis. The "E" comes from the Latin term "et al" (and others) as a tip to other partners and original employees of the company.

== History ==
LGarde engineers took their experience with inflatable structures for military use to space applications around 1992 as a means of controlling the cost of deploying instrumentation into Earth orbit and beyond. They studied development work and lessons learned from projects for the United States Department of Defense and the NASA going back to the 1960s. Observing the advantages and challenges of deploying a very large inflatable antenna and other structures in Earth orbit using this technology, LGarde engineers also observed changes in structural principles when such structures are used in a zero-gravity environment, and other technical issues arising for large precision structures including surface accuracy, analysis and electrical properties.

LGarde's first inflatable space structure project was the Spartan 207 Project, also known as the Inflatable Antenna Experiment, which was launched on Space Shuttle Endeavour during mission STS-77, May 19. 1996. The goal of this mission was to inflate a 14 metres (46 ft) antenna on three 28 metres (92 ft) struts built by LGarde under contract with the Jet Propulsion Laboratory (JPL). The project was developed under NASA's In-STEP technology development program.

Deployed using the shuttle's Remote Manipulator System, the antenna was successfully inflated and the correct final shape was attained. According to the final mission report, the mission was successful and gained a great deal of information about inflating large structures in space. Among the points that the Spartan 207 project proved was the viability of inflatable space structures as a cost-saving concept. The inflatable antenna weighed only about 132 pounds (60 kilograms) and an operational version of the antenna could be developed for less than US$10 million - a substantial savings over current mechanically deployable hard structures that may cost as much as US$200 million to develop and deliver to space.

LGarde engineers expanded their development of inflatable rigidizable structures with low mass structures strong enough to support orbital large solar arrays as well as much smaller nanosats. Among the many detail design parameters they considered were tube design (for rigidizable material), alternative beam types and designs (e.g., trusses), material thickness, laminates, and the best way to resolve Euler buckling.

A project, conducted with JPL under NASA's Gossamer Spacecraft program in 1999, sought to build an inflatable reflector to concentrate solar energy for space electrical power generation, while acting as a large aperture high gain antenna. Among the goals of the Gossamer Spacecraft program was to reduce the mass and stowage volumes of a power antenna while maintaining comparable yield from electrical power generation.

Additional development came in 2005, when LGarde began utilizing material rigidization methods that provide a long lasting reflector shape without requiring continuous inflation. Engineers settled on an aluminum/plastic laminate as the rigidization method of choice over cold rigidization of a Kevlar thermoplastic elastomer composite as a means of accomplishing two goals: 1) diminish stowage space and thereby expanding the potential aperture size of the mirror reflectors and 2) eliminate the need for “make-up” gas needed for purely inflatable reflectors to remain inflated in space. LGarde engineers later advanced the readiness level of the inflatable planar support structure for the gossamer antenna system with additional design, analysis, testing, and fabrication of an inflation-deployed rigidized support structure for the waveguide array.

Going into 2002, LGarde was developing polyurethane resins for a 3-ply composite laminate that could be used in the fabrication of rigidizable structures suitable for use in space. In a paper submitted to the American Institute of Aeronautics and Astronautics (AIAA), engineers found that such composites can be used to fabricate ultra-lightweight deployable rigidizable structures for space applications and that polyurethane was chosen because it could become rigid when exposed to the low temperatures of space. The paper goes on to observe that under NASA's SSP program (Space Solar Power Truss), a 24 feet (7.3 m) long inflatable-rigidizable truss using polyurethane composites withstood a compression load of 556 pounds (252 kg), 10% above its designed compression strength while reducing mass of comparable mechanical structures by a factor of 4.

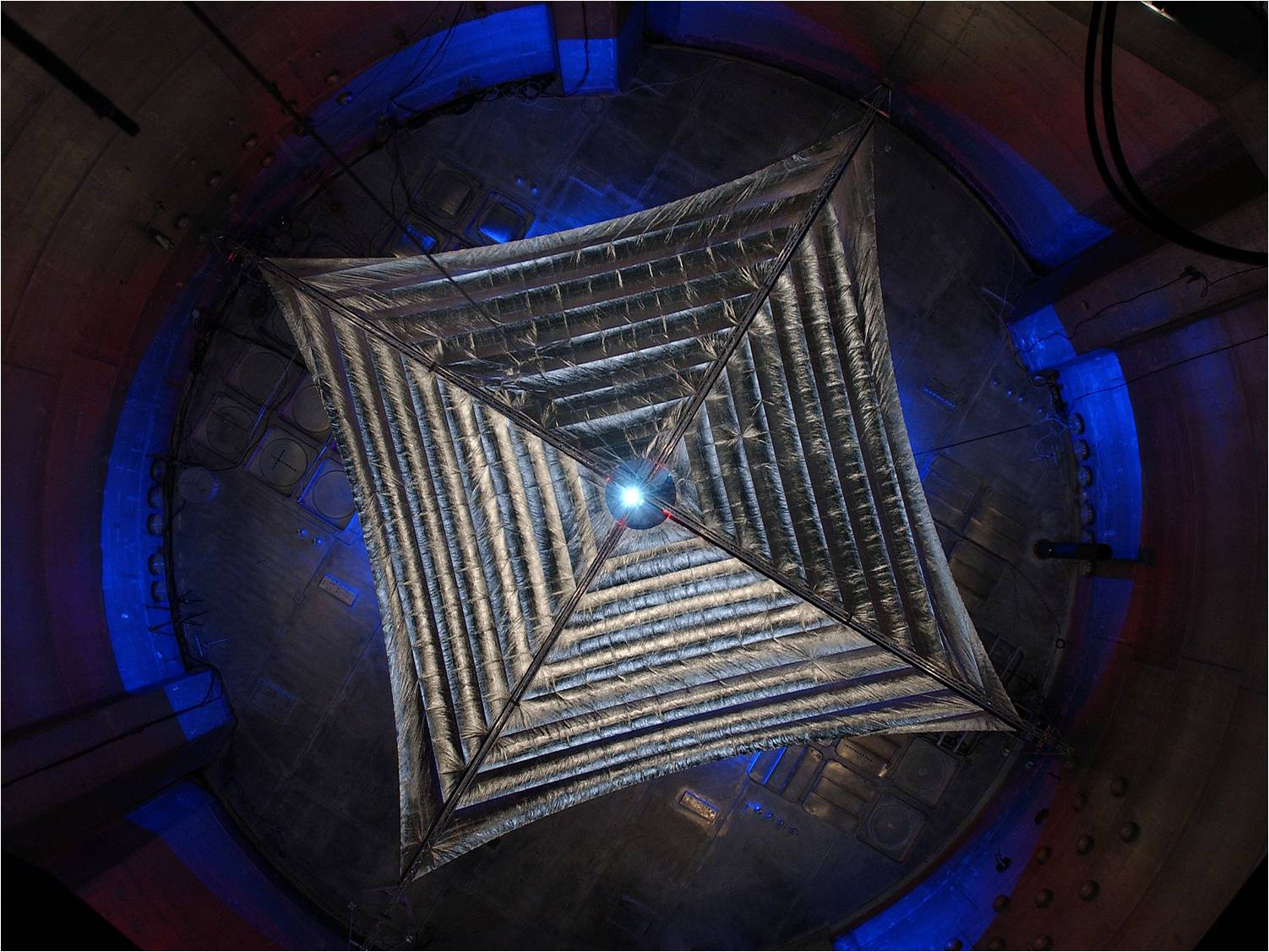
Sunjammer Solar Sail

It had been long theorized that solar sails could reflect photons streaming from the sun and convert some of the energy into thrust. The resulting thrust, though small, is continuous and acts for the life of the mission without the need for propellant. In 2003, LGarde, together with partners JPL, Ball Aerospace, and Langley Research Center, under the direction of NASA, developed a solar sail configuration that utilized inflatable rigidized boom components to achieve 10,000 m^{2} sailcraft with a real density of 14.1 g/m^{2} and potential acceleration of 0.58 mm/s^{2}. The entire configuration released by the upper stage has a mass of 232.9 kilograms (513 lb) and required just 1.7 cubic metres (60 cu ft) of volume in the booster. Additional advancement of the solar sail project came as LGarde engineers improved “sailcraft” coordinate systems and proposed a standard to report propulsion performance.

LGarde was selected by NASA to build the Sunjammer spacecraft, which would have been the world's largest solar sail. Slated for launch in January 2015, Sunjammer was constructed of kapton and was 38 metres (125 ft) square with a total surface area of over 1,200 square metres (13,000 sq ft), providing a thrust of about 0.01 N. The ultrathin 'sail' material was only 5 μm thick with a low weight of about 32 kilograms (70 lb). To control its orientation, Sunjammer would have used gimballed vanes (each of which is itself a small solar sail) located at the tips of each of its 4 booms completely eliminating the need for standard propellant.

On October 17, 2014, NASA cancelled the Sunjammer project after investing four years and more than US$21 million on the project.
