= CubeSail =

Planned solar sail spacecraft

- Mission type: Technology
- Website: www.surrey.ac.uk/surrey-space-centre/missions/cubesail
- Mission duration: 1 year (planned)

Spacecraft properties
- Spacecraft type: 3U CubeSat
- Manufacturer: Surrey Satellite Technology / Astrium
- BOL mass: 3 kg (6.6 lb)
- Dimensions: Sail: 5 m × 5 m Bus: 10 cm x 10 cm x 34 cm

Start of mission
- Launch date: TBD

Orbital parameters
- Reference system: Geocentric
- Regime: Low Earth orbit

CubeSail is a proposed nanosatellite project by the Surrey Space Centre (SSC) in England. The spacecraft is to be a 3U CubeSat propelled by a 25 m²solar sail. The project is financed and technically supported by aerospace manufacturers Astrium and Surrey Satellite Technology. It is designed for operation in low Earth orbit, serving as an atmospheric drag brake to facilitate the removal of satellite debris.

The first successful solar sail spacecraft was the Japanese IKAROS mission, launched on 21 May 2010.

== Overview ==
The project is further developing technologies first tested on their STRaND-1 CubeSat, launched in February 2013. CubeSail will deploy a 25 m^{2} solar sail, which will be used to demonstrate the propulsive effect of solar radiation pressure and the de-orbiting capabilities of the sail as a drag augmentation device.

=== Attitude control ===
CubeSail will be a three-axis stabilised solar sail satellite. Attitude control (orientation) is necessary because the orientation of the sail relative to the Sun direction will determine the propulsion force. Full three-axis attitude control will be performed by means of a centre of mass/centre of pressure offset technique, complemented by three magnetorquers and a reaction wheel. Attitude control can be enhanced by using the solar radiation pressure force on the sail to generate rotation torques. The radiation pressure can also be used to induce a change of altitude as well as orbital inclination.

The spacecraft will be deployed in a low Earth orbit (800 km altitude) on a Sun-synchronous orbit.

=== Configuration ===
The CubeSail nanosatellite is a CubeSat of the 3U format. The satellite bus occupies approximately 1U, and the remaining 2U house the two-axis translation stage and sail-deployment subsystem.

== Objectives ==
The objectives of the CubeSail mission are to demonstrate the concept of solar sail propulsion of a 3-axis stabilised 25 m^{2} solar sail for one year while in low Earth orbit; and to demonstrate the use of gossamer structures (very light gauze-like fabric) as a drag augmentation device for satellite de-orbiting.

== See also ==
- CubeSail (UltraSail) – US spacecraft
- IKAROS – First interplanetary solar sail spacecraft
- LightSail – LEO solar sailing demo project
- NanoSail-D2 – Satellite designed to test concept of solar sails
- Near-Earth Asteroid Scout – Solar sail spacecraft
- Sunjammer (spacecraft) – NASA mission intended to demonstrate a solar sail constructed by LGarde
