= CubeSail (UltraSail) =

US spacecraft

- Mission type: Technology: solar sail propulsion
- Operator: NASA / University of Illinois
- Website: cubesail.us and cuaerospace.com/about/cua-notable-achievements

Spacecraft properties
- Spacecraft type: 2 × 1.5 U CubeSats
- Manufacturer: University of Illinois
- Launch mass: ~ 3 kg

Start of mission
- Launch date: 16 December 2018
- Rocket: Electron
- Launch site: Rocket Lab LC-1
- Contractor: Rocket Lab

Orbital parameters
- Reference system: Geocentric
- Regime: Low Earth

CubeSail was a 2018 low-cost spacecraft propulsion demonstration mission using two identical 1.5U CubeSat satellites to deploy a 260 m (850 ft) long, 20 m^{2} (220 sq ft) solar sail ribbon between them. This mission was a first in a series of increasingly-complex planned demonstrations leading up to a full-scale UltraSail heliogyro by the University of Illinois and CU Aerospace.

== Background: Heliogyro ==
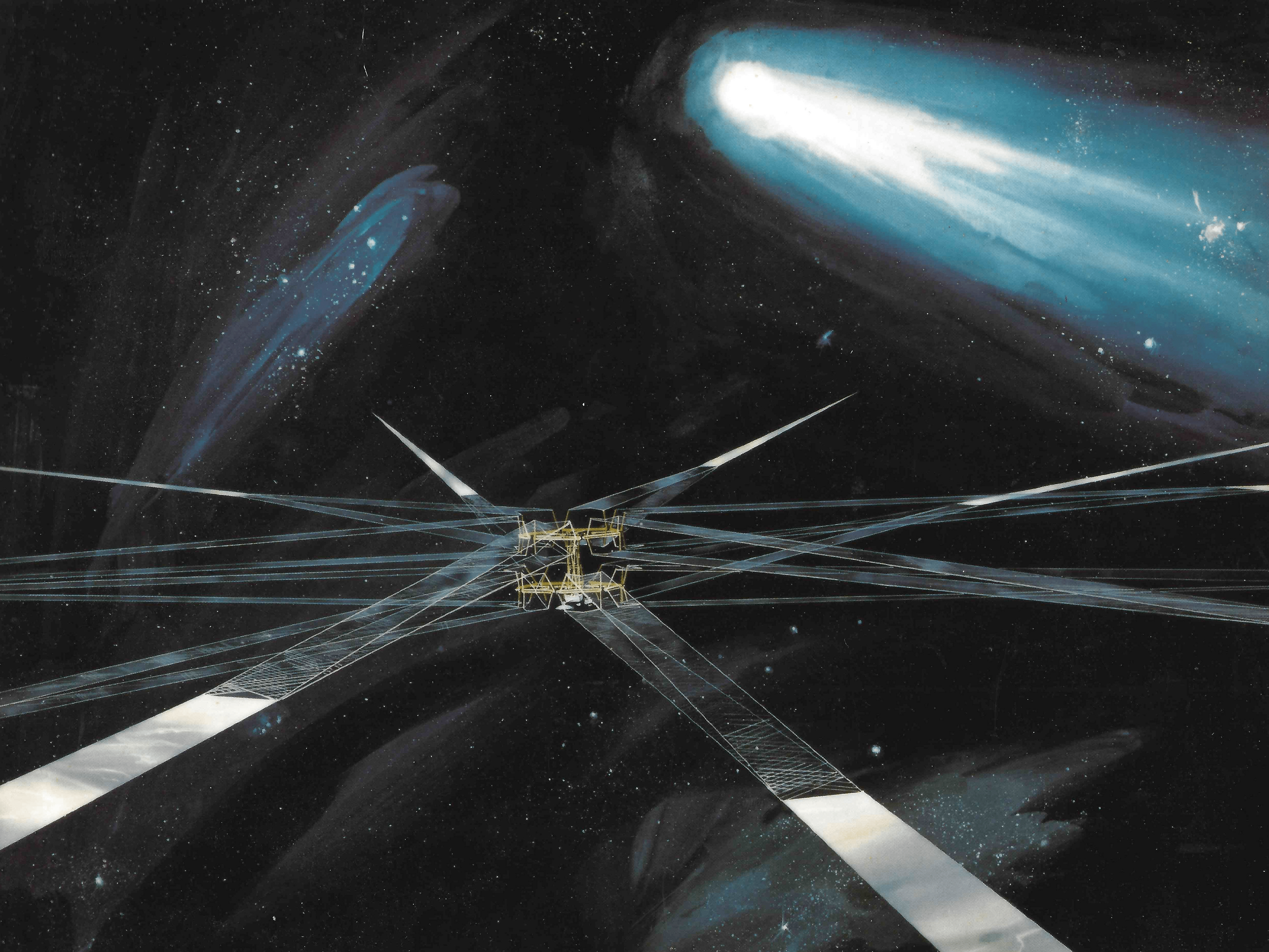
Artist's concept of a heliogyro, proposed to visit Halley's Comet in 1986. Each blade would be 8 m (26 ft) wide and 6.2 km (3.9 mi) long, for 0.6 km^{2} (0.23 sq mi) of sail area.

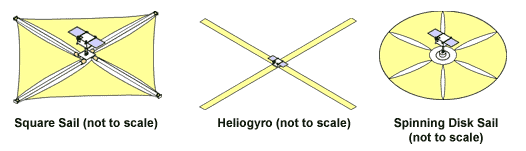
Solar sail types. A heliogyro could have dozens of blades

UltraSail is a proposed type of robotic spacecraft that uses radiation pressure exerted by sunlight for propulsion. It builds upon the "heliogyro" concept by Richard H. MacNeal, published in 1971, and consists of multiple rotating blades attached to a central hub.

The Heliogyro spacecraft's attitude (orientation), and therefore thrust direction, would be controlled by changing the cyclic and collective blade pitch similar to a helicopter.

Although the Heliogyro design has no mass advantage over a square sail, it remains attractive because the method of deploying large sail blades is simpler than a strut-based design. Blade stiffness is achieved by spinning the spacecraft (centrifugal force) with its rotational axis generally pointing at the Sun.

== CubeSail spacecraft ==
=== Overview ===
The University of Illinois together with CU Aerospace designed this mission to demonstrate deployment and to measure the thrust on a 7.7 cm × 250 m membrane (about 20 m^{2}) made of aluminized mylar. The membrane is deployed between two 1.5U CubeSats that separate from each other in low Earth orbit. It is intended as a first step towards the development of the larger solar sail concept called UltraSail.

Re-orientation of the CubeSats will cause the sail to undergo aerodynamic drag in the upper atmosphere for its disposal.

=== Selection ===
The spacecraft was selected in 2012 by NASA to be launched as part of the ELaNa program.

== Launch ==
CubeSail was launched on an Electron launch vehicle on 16 December 2018 from New Zealand.

While "satellite beacons at the correct frequency were observed post-launch once on 18 Dec. 2018", there was not "sufficient signal to noise ratio to demodulate the call sign in the beacons.", and "no further communications were received from CubeSail".

Based upon the state vector initially provided by Rocket Lab after deployment, our best assessment is that CubeSail was Space-Track Object #43853 (“Object E”) which began with an average orbital altitude of 505 km. Space-Track.org lists this object as having decayed and burned up in the atmosphere on 14 December 2022, almost 4 years after launch.

== Follow-on ==
=== I-sail ===
The proposed second mission of the project is called I-Sail, proposed to be launched in 2022, and would consist of a 25 kg (55 lb) spacecraft with bilateral blades with a total sail area of 2,500 m^{2}. It will demonstrate thrust levels many times those of ion thrusters used for deep space missions and perform an Earth gravity escape. Several science objectives are being assessed as secondary objectives. The project is being funded by NASA's Small Business Innovation Research (SBIR) program.

=== UltraSail ===
CubeSail and I-Sail are intended as steps towards the development of a larger (1,600 kg) solar sail concept called UltraSail for interplanetary and interstellar missions. This last consists of multiple CubeSail-like structures that extend kilometers long film blades attached to a central hub to ultimately form a heliogyro. The UltraSail blade material, the body of the solar sail, is mounted on multiple reels, each with a width of 5–10 m, and deployed to a blade length up to 5 km (3.1 mi) for a total 100,000 m^{2} of sail area. The spacecraft spins around the central hub to flatten the blades by centrifugal force, supported by tip-CubeSats. For the kilometre long blades' stability, this requires a rotational period of 1–2 hours so they overcome the solar pressure force by 3 to 5 times. Each blade is a thin polyimide film coated with ripstop.

For UltraSail, blade control (and hence the spacecraft's attitude control) is initiated by small controllable mini-satellites (tipsats) at the tip of each blade. The tipsat mass provides a stabilizing centrifugal force on the blade while in rotation. Each tipsat would be a 5-meter long carbon-fiber structure with a total mass of 50 kg, including avionics and 20 kg propellant (catalyzed nitrous oxide (N_{2}O) and cold gas). Alternatively, the tipsats could be propelled with electric microthrusters to control blade pitch.

The maximum expected thrust force due to solar pressure is equivalent to 400 kW ion thruster systems used for comparable deep space missions.

== See also ==
- IKAROS, a Japanese solar sail, launched in May 2010
- NanoSail-D2, the successor to NanoSail-D, launched in November 2010
- LightSail, a controlled solar sail CubeSat launched in July 2019
- Near-Earth Asteroid Scout, a solar sail CubeSat currently planned to launch in 2020
- Sunjammer, a solar sail that was cancelled before launch in 2014
