= LightSail =

LEO solar sailing demo project

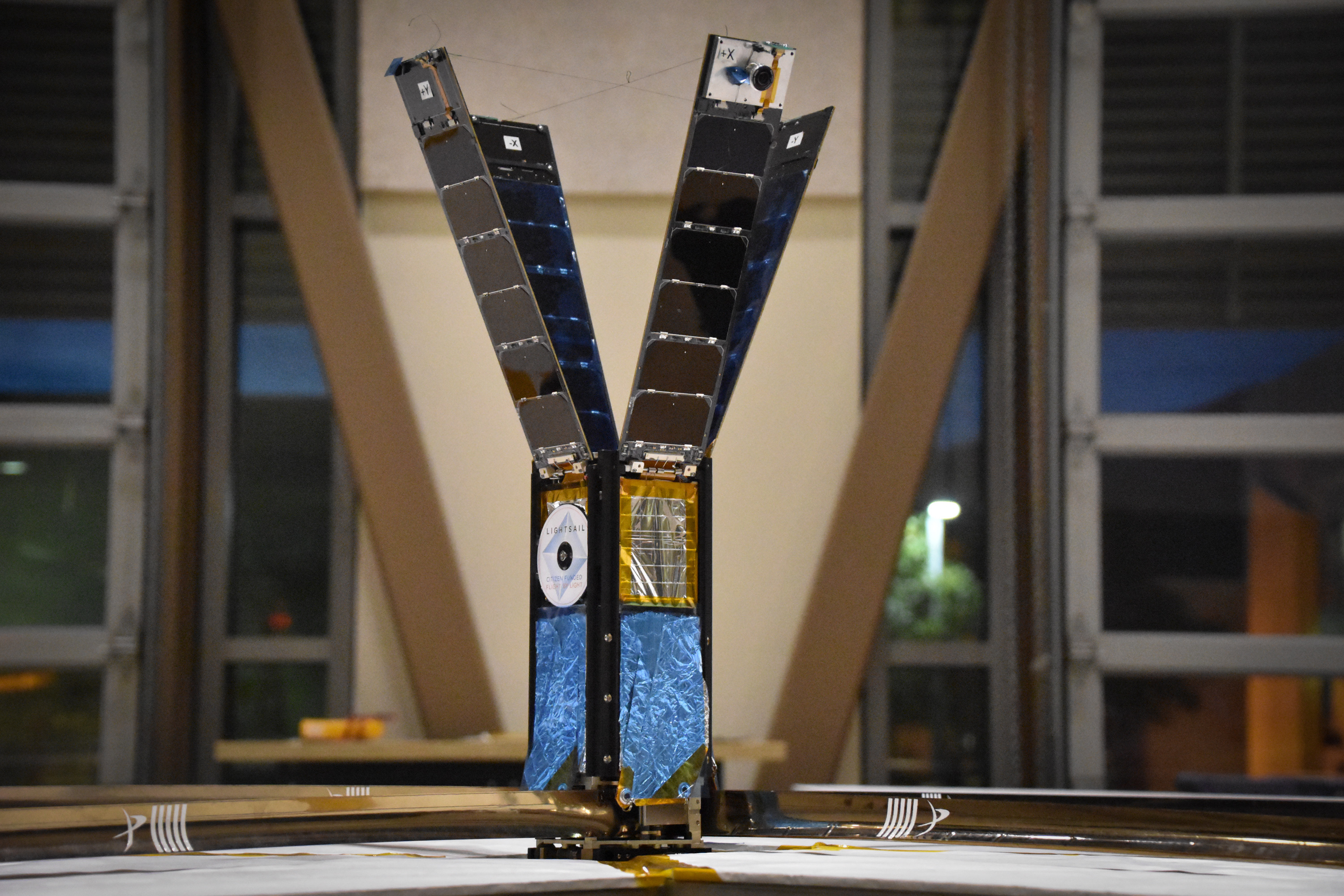
- LightSail 2 after a boom deployment test
- Names: LightSail A LightSail 2
- Mission type: Technology demonstration
- Operator: The Planetary Society
- COSPAR ID: 2019-036AC
- SATCAT no.: 44420
- Website: sail.planetary.org
- Mission duration: LightSail 1 Final: 25 days LightSail 2 Final: 3 years, 4 months and 23 days

Spacecraft properties
- Spacecraft type: Solar sail
- Bus: 3U CubeSat
- Manufacturer: Stellar Exploration, Inc., Ecliptic Enterprises Corporation, Cal Poly San Luis Obispo
- Dimensions: Core: 30 cm × 10 cm × 10 cm (11.8 in × 3.9 in × 3.9 in); Sail: 32 m^{2} (340 sq ft)

Start of mission
- Launch date: LightSail 1: 20 May 2015; LightSail 2: 25 June 2019
- Rocket: LightSail 1: Atlas V LightSail 2: Falcon Heavy

End of mission
- Decay date: LightSail 1: 14 June 2015; LightSail 2: 17 November 2022

LightSail is a project to demonstrate controlled solar sailing within low Earth orbit using a CubeSat. The project was developed by The Planetary Society, a global non-profit organization devoted to space exploration. It consists of two spacecraft — LightSail 1 and LightSail 2. LightSail 1 was an engineering demonstration mission designed to test its new sail deployment method in space; it did not perform solar sailing. LightSail 2 was a fully functional spacecraft intended to demonstrate true solar sailing and incorporated the lessons learned from LightSail 1. LightSail is a follow-on project to Cosmos 1 — a solar-sail spacecraft designed by The Planetary Society in the early 2000s, which was destroyed during a launch failure in 2005.

Both LightSail spacecraft measured 30 cm × 10 cm × 10 cm (11.8 in × 3.9 in × 3.9 in) (3U CubeSat) in their stowed configuration. After sail deployment, the total area of each spacecraft was 32 m^{2} (340 sq ft).

== History ==
In 2005, The Planetary Society attempted to send a solar sail satellite named Cosmos 1 into space, but the spacecraft's Russian Volna launch vehicle failed to reach orbit. In 2009, the Society began working on a CubeSat-based solar sail based on NASA's NanoSail-D project, which was lost in August 2008 due to the failure of its Falcon 1 launch vehicle. (A second unit, NanoSail-D2, was successfully deployed in early 2011.)

In 2011, the LightSail project passed its Critical Design Review (CDR), which was conducted by a team including Jet Propulsion Laboratory (JPL) project veterans Harris "Bud" Schurmeier, Glenn Cunningham, and Viktor Kerzhanovich, as well as Dave Bearden of Aerospace Corporation.

On 20 May 2015, LightSail 1 (formerly called LightSail-A) launched. It deployed its solar sail on 7 June 2015 and re-entered the atmosphere, as planned, on 14 June 2015.

In March 2016, The Planetary Society announced a new naming convention for the spacecraft: the test flight (originally LightSail-A) was renamed LightSail 1, with the second spacecraft named LightSail 2. LightSail 2 launched as a secondary payload on the Space Test Program (STP-2) on a Falcon Heavy launch vehicle on 25 June 2019. It deployed its solar sail on 23 July 2019, and successfully downlinked photographs of the deployed sail on 24 July 2019.

The Society has stated it has no plans for a LightSail 3.

== Design ==
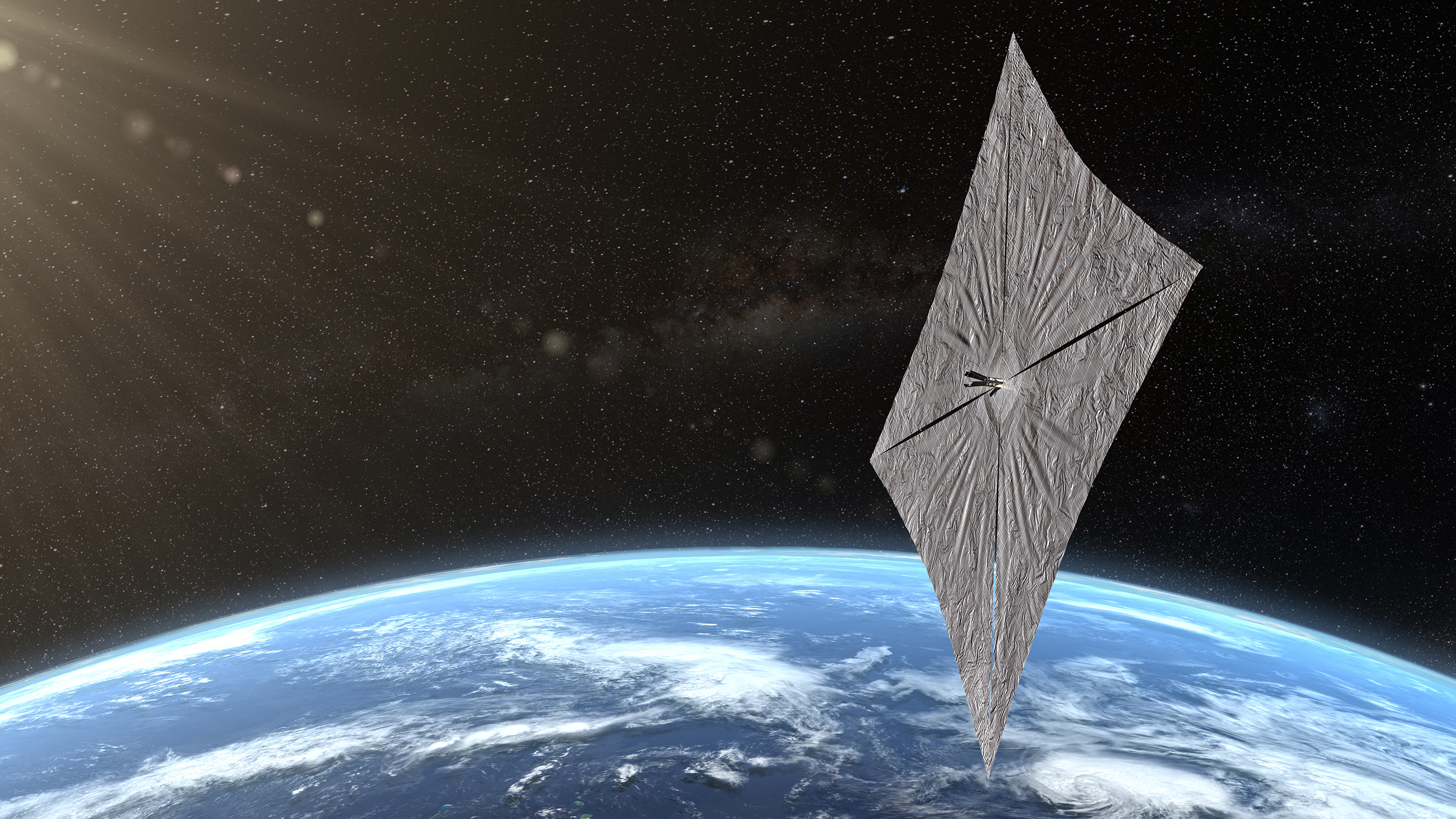
Artist's concept of LightSail orbiting the Earth

As a solar sail, LightSail's propulsion relies on solar radiation and not the charged particles of the solar wind. Solar photons exert radiation pressure on the sail, which produces an acceleration on the spacecraft relative to the ratio of the sail's area to its mass. As such, the design challenge was to maximize the surface area of the sail while minimizing the mass of the spacecraft — all while adhering to the standard 3-unit CubeSat size limitation.

LightSail's modular design is based on a modular 3-unit CubeSat, a small satellite format created for university-level space projects. One CubeSat-sized module carries the cameras, sensors and control systems, and the other two units contain and deploy the solar sails.

The spacecraft contains four triangular sails, which combine to form a rectangular-shaped surface. The sails are made of Mylar, a reflective polyester film.

LightSail has multiple configurations. It was launched in a stowed configuration with its sails folded within the spacecraft. After launch, it enters an intermediate phase by deploying a small antenna and flipping open its solar panels. This exposes the cameras and reveals the stowed solar sails. To achieve its final "solar sailing" configuration, LightSail extends four 4-meter cobalt alloy booms that slowly spread open the mylar sail material. Using an internal reaction wheel, LightSail 2 is able to orient itself against the Sun using Earth's magnetic field as a guide. By "tacking" in and out of the Sun, it can control the force on its sail and thus change its orbit.

== Costs and funding ==
The entire LightSail project cost US$7 million over 10 years and was paid for by approximately 40,000 individual donors, including US$1.24 million raised from a successful Kickstarter campaign in 2015. Launch costs were supported by NASA's Educational Launch of Nanosatellites program (LightSail 1) and the Air Force Research Laboratory's University Nanosat Program (LightSail 2).

== LightSail 1 ==
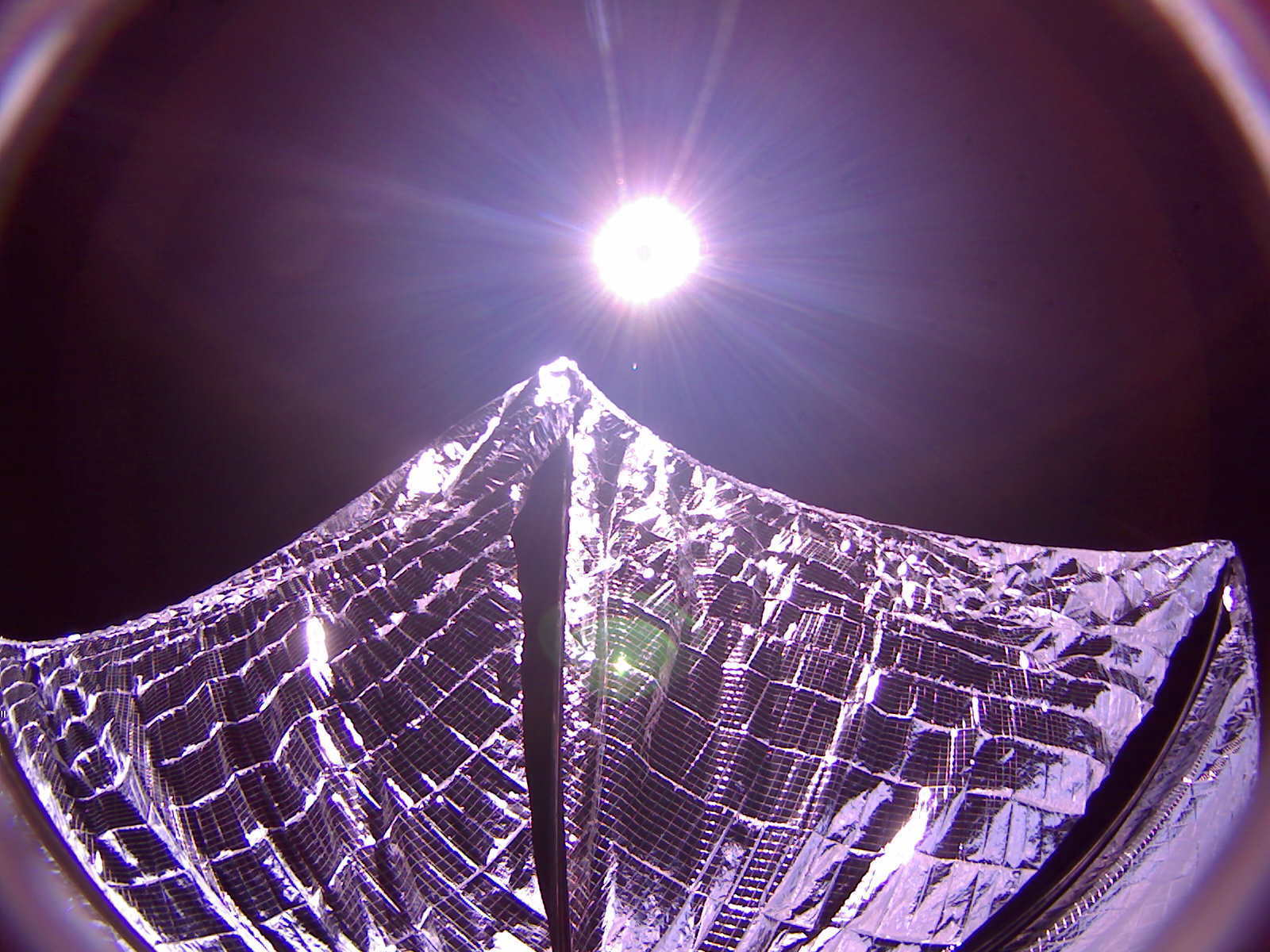
LightSail 1 with deployed solar sails, 8 June 2015.

A preliminary technology demonstrator spacecraft, LightSail 1 (formerly LightSail-A), was launched as a secondary payload aboard a United Launch Alliance Atlas V launch vehicle at 15:05 UTC on 20 May 2015 from Cape Canaveral Air Force Station, Florida. The mission delivered the satellite to an orbit where atmospheric drag was greater than the force exerted by solar radiation pressure.

Two days after the launch, however, the spacecraft suffered a software malfunction, which made it unable to deploy the solar sail or to communicate. On 31 May 2015, The Planetary Society reported having regained contact with LightSail 1. After the solar panels were deployed on 3 June 2015, communications with the spacecraft were lost once more on 4 June 2015. In this case, a fault with the battery system was suspected. Contact was then reestablished on 6 June 2015, and the sail deployment was initiated on 7 June 2015. At a conference on 10 June 2015, after photos of deployment were downloaded, the test flight was declared a success. The spacecraft reentered the atmosphere on 14 June 2015, ending the test flight.

== LightSail 2 ==
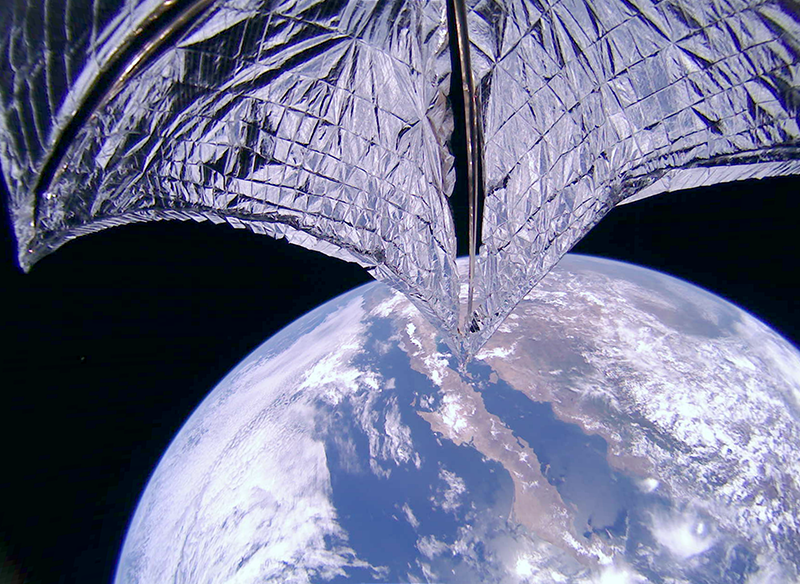
LightSail 2 with deployed solar sail, 23 July 2019.

LightSail 2 (COSPAR 2019-036AC) was a CubeSat fitted with a solar sail the size of a boxing ring, covering 32 m^{2} (340 sq ft). The sail captured incoming photons from the Sun, just as a wind sail catches the moving air molecules, to propel the spacecraft.

LightSail 2 was launched on 25 June 2019 and deployed by the Prox-1 carrier satellite into a much higher low Earth orbit than LightSail 1, at over 720 km (450 mi) orbital altitude. It was to demonstrate controlled solar sailing in low Earth orbit. By controlling the orientation of the sail relative to the Sun, the flight team hoped to raise the orbit apogee and increase orbital energy following sail deployment. Prox-1 and LightSail 2 were secondary payloads aboard the second operational SpaceX Falcon Heavy launch, which carried the STP-2 payload for the U.S. Air Force.

Researchers received the first pictures from LightSail 2 on 7 July 2019, and its solar sails were deployed on 23 July 2019. On 31 July 2019, the Planetary Society stated that they had raised LightSail 2 orbit by a measurable amount, although it spent a significant amount of its time randomly tumbling. LightSail 2 successfully demonstrated propulsion by solar sail.

Though initially planned to reenter Earth's atmosphere after approximately one year, an extended mission was approved on 25 June 2020. The Planetary Society website showed that the mission was continuously active until 16 November 2022. On 17 November 2022, LightSail 2 reentered the atmosphere.

== See also ==
- CubeSail
- CubeSail (UltraSail)
- IKAROS, an interplanetary Japanese solar sail, launched in May 2010
- NanoSail-D2, the successor to NanoSail-D, launched in November 2010
- Near-Earth Asteroid Scout, a solar sail launched in 2022
- OKEANOS, a large Japanese solar sail proposal (not selected for mission) to explore Jupiter Trojans
- Sunjammer, a solar sail that was canceled before launch in 2014
