= Icarus Theatre Collective =

The Icarus Theatre Collective is a British theatre company located in London, England.

== History ==
The Icarus Theatre Collective is a mid-scale theatre company that functions as a collective. A team of artists and managers run the company under the direction of the company founder, Max Lewendel. Many team members collaborate on varied tasks and responsibilities though each individual artist can pitch their own major project.

Icarus Theatre Collective was formed in the winter of 2003/2004 as a small, informal group of theatre professionals. In 2005, Icarus registered formally as a company and the Finborough Theatre commissioned them to produce a piece of new writing entitled “Albert’s Boy” by James Graham. After a break of 18 months, Icarus came back together to produce “The Lesson” by Eugène Ionesco which toured 37 venues across the country. In 2010, the company began with new writing about a gay teenager in 1981 Northern Ireland, Rip Her to Shreds, and followed with over 100 performances of Hamlet, done in the style of Greek Chorus.
