= Ikarus Drachen Tomas Pellicci =

German aircraft manufacturer

- Industry: Aerospace
- Founder: Tomas Pellicci
- Headquarters: Stephanskirchen, Germany
- Products: Hang gliders
- Website: www.ikaruspellicci.de

Ikarus Drachen Tomas Pellicci (English: Thomas Pellicci) is a German aircraft manufacturer based in Stephanskirchen, founded by Tomas Pellicci. The company specializes in the design and construction of beginner hang gliders for schools and flight training use.

== History ==
Tomas Pellicci was born on 23 May 1950, in Stephanskirchen, but emigrated to Australia in his early twenties, where he became involved in flying hang gliders, towed by boats. In 1973, he returned to Germany, where he met an American soldier, Californian Mike Harker, who was flying from hills. His background in model-making earned him a job at a local flight school repairing and modifying Ikarus hang gliders and eventually took over the company. By 2019 he was selling six to eight gliders per year.

== Aircraft ==
Summary of aircraft built by Ikarus Drachen Tomas Pellicci
Model name	First flight	Number built	Type
Ikarus Funflyer			hang glider
Ikarus Doppel			hang glider
Ikarus Duo Club			hang glider
Ikarus Grasshopper			hang glider
Ikarus Imagine			hang glider
Ikarus Spirit L			hang glider
