= Icarus (R3hab song) =

Single by R3hab
- Released: October 7, 2016
- Recorded: 2016
- Genre: Future house
- Length: 3:12
- Label: R3hab Music
- Songwriters: Fadil El Ghoul, Nikki Taylor, Eric Zeiler
- Producer: Fadil El Ghoul

R3hab singles chronology
"Sakura" (2016)	"Icarus" (2016)	"Everything" (2016)

"Icarus" is an electronic single by Dutch DJ and record producer R3hab. The track became his first solo number one single in the United States (and his second, as a featured artist on Havana Brown and Prophet's "Big Banana") on Billboard's Dance Club Songs chart, reaching the summit in its December 24, 2016 issue.

== Track listing ==
Digital download
No.	Title	Length
1.	"Icarus"	3:12

Digital download – Remixes
No.	Title	Length
1.	"Icarus" (R3hab & Skytech Remix)	2:16
2.	"Icarus" (Black Caviar Remix)	3:14
3.	"Icarus" (Ghost Loft Remix)	3:38

== Charts ==
Chart (2016)	Peak position
US Hot Dance/Electronic Songs (Billboard)	23
US Dance Club Songs (Billboard)	1
US Dance/Mix Show Airplay (Billboard)	12
