= Project Icarus (photography) =

Project Icarus was a project at the Massachusetts Institute of Technology (MIT) in 2009.

== Project ==
Project Icarus was an experiment in 2009 to launch a camera into the stratosphere undertaken by MIT students, Justin Lee and Oliver Yeh.

The launch vehicle consisted of a weather balloon filled with helium and a styrofoam beer cooler that hung underneath the balloon. Inside the cooler was a Canon A470 compact camera, hacked using the Canon Hacker's Development Kit open-source firmware to shoot pictures in five-second intervals. To keep the temperature of the batteries high enough for the camera to work it was heated by instant hand warmers. In order to keep track of the vehicle's location a prepaid GPS-equipped cellphone was included.

The launch occurred in Sturbridge, Massachusetts at 11:45 am on September 2, 2009. The device traveled to around 93,000 feet (28 km) before free falling back to Earth. It was eventually recovered in Worcester, Massachusetts. The mission was a success, and the pictures were retrieved. The project cost only $148.

"We looked at these photographs and thought wow, these are beautiful—this is artwork," said Lee. "This inspired us to sit down and really think deep about the relationships between science and art."

According to the Federal Aviation Administration, the launch was legal because the payload was under 4 pounds (1.8 kg). However, they advised anyone interested in a future launch to contact the federal agency beforehand.

The MIT students were not the first to take pictures of the Earth using helium balloons, but this experiment is noteworthy because it used inexpensive consumer products and did not require specialized hardware.

== See also ==
- 1566 Icarus
- Icarus
- Project Icarus (interstellar)
