= NanoSail-D2 =

Satellite designed to test concept of solar sails

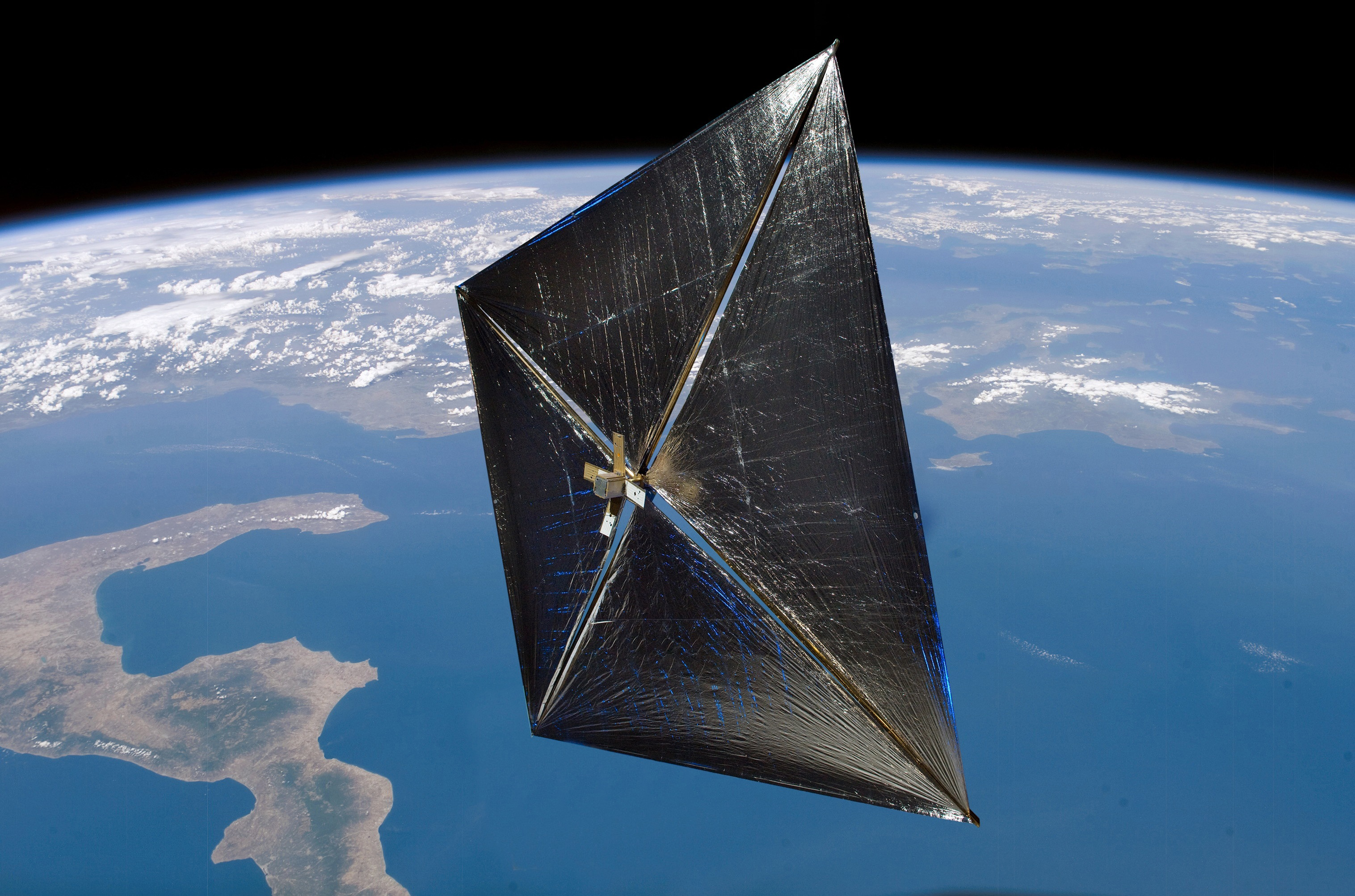
- Mission type: Technology
- Operator: NASA
- COSPAR ID: 2010-070L
- SATCAT no.: 37361
- Mission duration: 240 days

Spacecraft properties
- Spacecraft type: 3U CubeSat
- Manufacturer: NASA Ames Research Center; NASA Marshall Space Flight Center
- Launch mass: 4 kg (8.8 lb)
- Dimensions: 30 cm × 10 cm × 10 cm (11.8 in × 3.9 in × 3.9 in)
- Power: Batteries

Start of mission
- Launch date: 20 November 2010, 01:25 UTC
- Rocket: Minotaur IV / HAPS
- Launch site: Kodiak Launch Complex, Pad 1
- Contractor: Orbital Sciences
- Deployed from: FASTSAT
- Deployment date: Commanded: 3 December 2010; Occurred: 17 January 2011

End of mission
- Decay date: 17 September 2011

Orbital parameters
- Reference system: Geocentric orbit
- Regime: Low Earth orbit
- Perigee altitude: 615 km (382 mi)
- Apogee altitude: 648 km (403 mi)
- Inclination: 71.97°
- Period: 97.34 minutes

NanoSail-D2 was a small satellite built by NASA's Marshall Space Flight Center and Ames Research Center to study the deployment of a solar sail in space. It was a three-unit CubeSat, measuring 30 cm × 10 cm × 10 cm (11.8 in × 3.9 in × 3.9 in) with a mass of 4 kg (8.8 lb). Its solar sail had an area of 10 m^{2} (110 sq ft), and was deployed in around five seconds.

It was planned to be deployed from the FASTSAT satellite around 3 December 2010, two weeks after launch. The satellite did not eject at that time, but on 17 January 2011, it ejected on its own and deployed its sail three days later on 20 January 2011. The beacon signal began transmitting after ejection and was first received on the afternoon of 19 January 2011.

== Chronology ==
NanoSail-D2 was originally built as a ground spare for the NanoSail-D satellite, which was launched aboard a Falcon 1 in 2008, and was subsequently lost when the launch vehicle malfunctioned during stage separation. Over the next two years improvements were made to the spare, and the satellite was incorporated into the FASTSAT mission. The mission objectives for NanoSail-D2 were to demonstrate sail deployment with the Triangular Rollable and Collapsible boom and de-orbit capability. The deployment was successfully demonstrated. The sail was not used for propulsion of the satellite.

NanoSail-D2 was launched aboard a Minotaur IV / HAPS launch vehicle, inside the FASTSAT satellite. FASTSAT was a secondary payload on the launch, with the primary payload being STPSat-2. The launch also carried RAX, O/OREOS, FalconSat-5, and the two FASTRAC satellites; Sara-Lily and Emma. The Minotaur was launched from Launch Pad 1 of the Kodiak Launch Complex at 01:25 UTC on 20 November 2010. Orbital Sciences Corporation conducted the launch under a contract with the United States Air Force.

FASTSAT was deployed into a low Earth orbit with a circular orbit of 650 km (400 mi) of altitude and 72° of inclination. NanoSail-D2 was expected to separate from FASTSAT on 6 December 2010, but the bay door did not open, preventing its ejection. Successful ejection was confirmed on 19 January 2011; it is unclear what caused the ejection mechanism to fail and then ultimately release at this later date. NASA requested amateur radio operators listen for the beacon signal from NanoSail-D. They did and picked up the 1-second beacon transmissions which were transmitted every 10 seconds. While battery power was soon exhausted, as predicted by the principal investigator, Dean Alhorn, the spacecraft was expected to sail on in low-Earth orbit for 70 to 120 days, depending on atmospheric conditions, before it burnt up, and to become easier to view after the atmosphere stabilized its tumbling.

To generate publicity and to encourage observations while the sail was still in orbit, NASA and Spaceweather.com announced a photography competition with a grand prize of US$500 to capture images of the solar sail in orbit.

On 17 September 2011, the solar sail re-entered the atmosphere after 240 days in orbit, though this was only announced on 29 November 2011.

== See also ==
- NanoSail-D, the failed predecessor to NanoSail-D2, launched in August 2008
- IKAROS, a Japanese solar sail, launched in May 2010
- LightSail 2, a controlled solar sail CubeSat launched in July 2019
- CubeSail (UltraSail), a sail technology demonstration launched in 2018
- Near-Earth Asteroid Scout, a solar sail CubeSat launched in 2022
- CubeSail, a planned cubesat sail mission
- Sunjammer, a solar sail that was cancelled before launch in 2014
