= Near-Earth Asteroid Scout =

Solar sail spacecraft

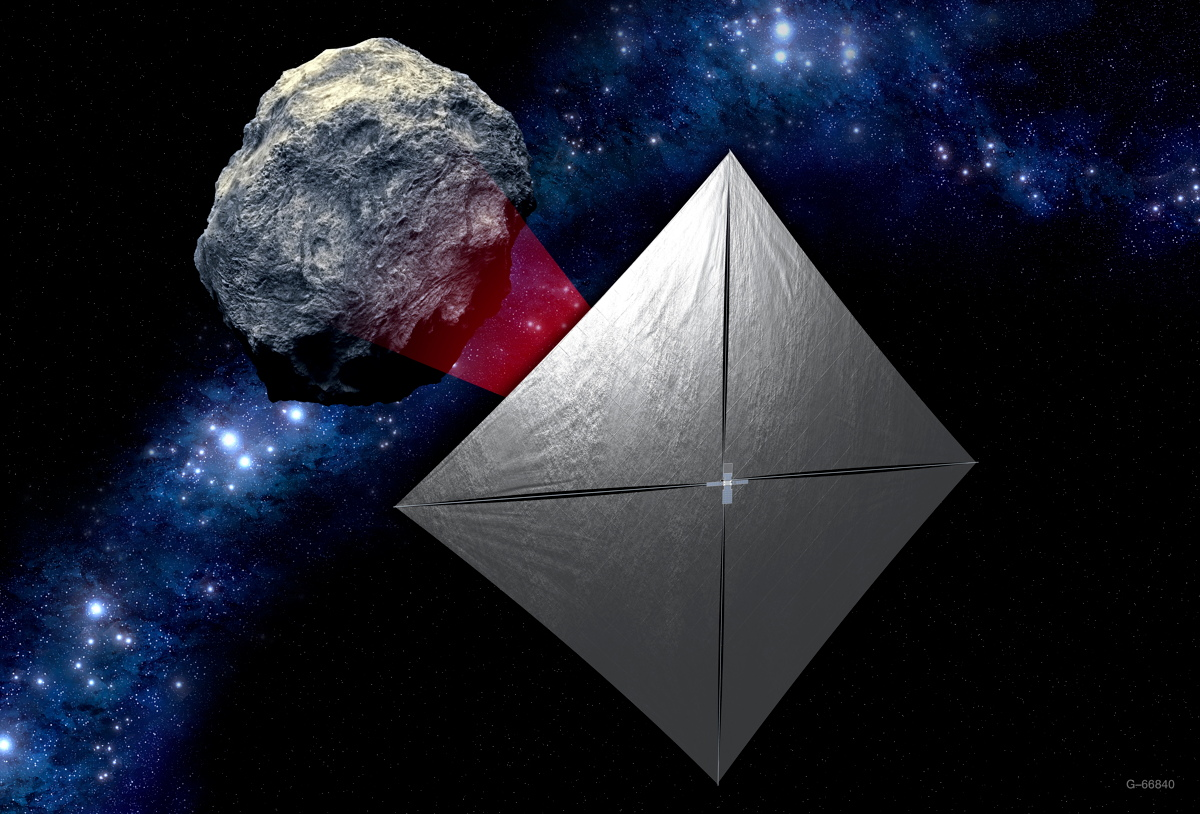
- NEA Scout concept: a controllable CubeSat solar sail spacecraft
- Names: NEA Scout
- Mission type: Technology demonstrator, Reconnaissance
- Operator: NASA
- COSPAR ID: 2022-156H
- SATCAT no.: 57684
- Mission duration: 2.5 years (planned); 2 days (final)

Spacecraft properties
- Spacecraft type: CubeSat
- Bus: 6U CubeSat
- Launch mass: 14 kg (31 lb)
- Dimensions: 10 cm × 20 cm × 30 cm (3.9 in × 7.9 in × 11.8 in); Solar sail: 85 m^{2} (910 sq ft)

Start of mission
- Launch date: 16 November 2022, 06:47:44 UTC
- Rocket: SLS Block 1
- Launch site: KSC, LC-39B
- Contractor: NASA

End of mission
- Last contact: Never established

Orbital parameters
- Reference system: Heliocentric orbit

Transponders
- Band: X-band
- TWTA power: 2 watts
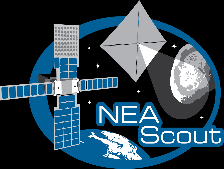
- NEA Scout Mission Patch

The Near-Earth Asteroid Scout (NEA Scout) was a mission by NASA to develop a controllable low-cost CubeSat solar sail spacecraft capable of encountering near-Earth asteroids (NEA). NEA Scout was one of ten CubeSats launched into a heliocentric orbit on Artemis 1, the maiden flight of the Space Launch System, on 16 November 2022.

The target for the mission was asteroid 2020 GE, but this could have changed based on launch date or other factors. After deployment, NEA Scout was to perform a series of lunar flybys to achieve optimum departure trajectory before beginning its two-year-long cruise.

No contact with the spacecraft was ever made, and the mission was lost.

== Overview ==
The mission was funded by NASA's Human Exploration and Operations Mission Directorate. Near-Earth asteroids (NEAs) are of interest to science, and as NASA continues to refine its plans to possibly explore these small objects with human explorers, initial reconnaissance with inexpensive robotic precursors is necessary to minimize risks, and inform the required instruments for future reconnaissance missions. The characterization of NEAs that are larger than 20 m (66 ft) in diameter is also of great relevance to plan mitigation strategies for planetary defense.

NASA's Marshall Space Flight Center (MSFC) and Jet Propulsion Laboratory (JPL) jointly developed this mission with support from NASA's Goddard Space Flight Center (GSFC), Lyndon B. Johnson Space Center (JSC), Langley Research Center (LRC), and NASA Headquarters. The principal investigator (science) was Julie Castillo-Rogez from NASA's JPL. The principal investigator was Les Johnson from NASA MSFC.

== Goal ==
The NASA Near Earth Asteroid (NEA) Scout mission was going to demonstrate the capability of an extremely small spacecraft, propelled by a solar sail, to perform reconnaissance of an asteroid at low cost. The goal was to develop a capability that would close knowledge gaps at a near-Earth asteroid in the 1–100 m range. NEAs in the 1–100 m range are poorly characterized due to the challenges that come with detecting, observing, and tracking these for extended periods of time. It has been thought that objects in the 1–100 m size range are fragments of bigger objects. However, it has also been suggested that these objects could actually be rubble piles.

The mission researchers argued that "characterization of NEAs that are larger than 20 m in diameter is also of great relevance to inform mitigation strategies for planetary defense".

== Target ==
The planned target was near-Earth asteroid 2020 GE. The asteroid made a close approach to Earth in September 2023 of around 5.7 million kilometres, which was when NEA Scout was scheduled to make its flyby. The spacecraft would have approached the asteroid at less than a mile distant, and make the slowest flyby of any asteroid by any spacecraft at less than 30 m/s. A 14 megapixel camera, the mission's sole instrument, was going to image the object at very high resolutions of up to 10 cm/pixel.

2020 GE is no more than 18 meters across, and would have been the smallest object yet explored by spacecraft.

== Status ==
As of 17 November 2022, NEA Scout was one of two out of the ten cubesats released by Artemis I whose status remained unknown. Communications with the spacecraft had not been established as of 18 November 2022, two days after launch.

As of December 2022, NEA Scout was considered lost, after deployment of its solar sail had failed and contact could not be established.

== Payload ==
Observations would have been achieved using a CubeSat performing a close (~10 km) flyby, equipped with a high resolution science-grade monochromatic camera to measure the physical properties of a near-Earth object. The camera was a custom JPL design. The electronics were based on the context camera design for the Orbiting Carbon Observatory 3 (OCO3) instrument with a custom firmware, a ruggedized commercial lens and a fully re-designed enclosure. The measurements to be addressed included target's accurate positioning (position and prediction), rotation rate and pole position, mass, density, mapping of particles and debris field in target vicinity, albedo and asteroid spectral type, surface morphologies and properties, and regolith properties. The mission used NASA's Deep Space Network as the primary component for communications and tracking.

== Design ==
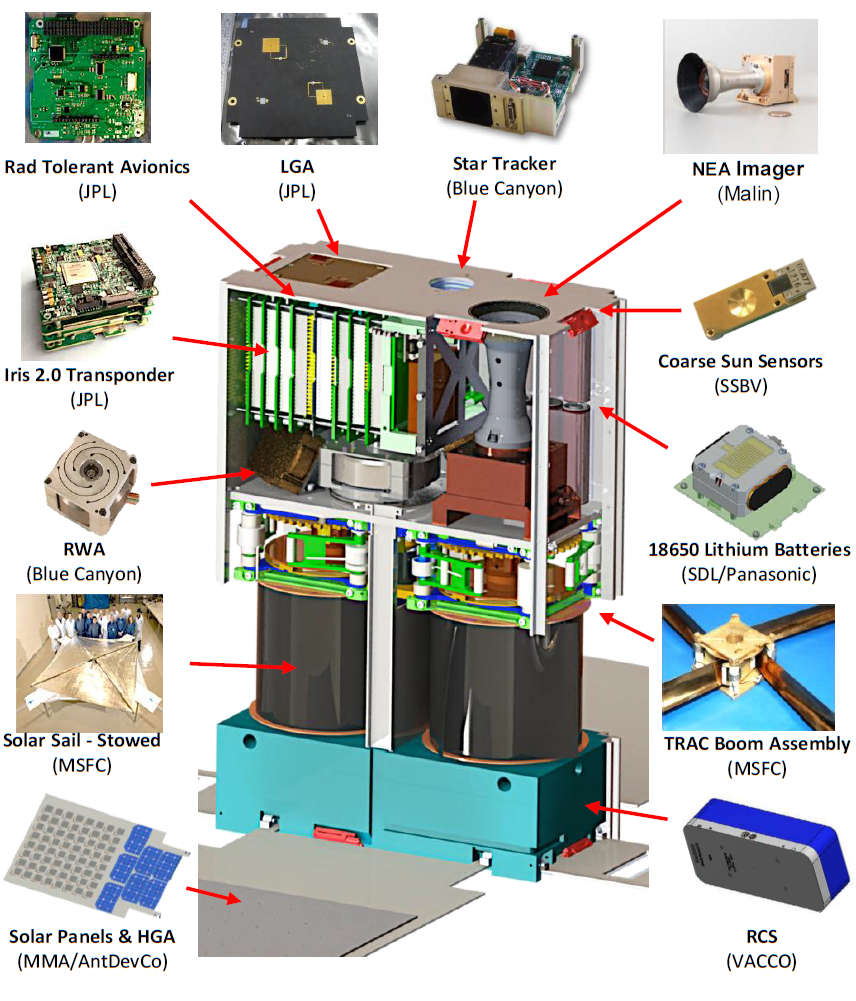
Components of the NEA Scout

The spacecraft architecture, first presented in 2014, was based on a 6-unit CubeSat with a stowed envelope slightly larger than 10 × 20 × 30 cm, a mass of 14 kg (31 lb), cold gas thruster system, and was primarily based on the use of commercial off-the-shelf parts. While it is possible for a 6U CubeSat to reach an NEA with conventional chemical propulsion, both the number of targets and the launch window would be tightly constrained. By utilizing solar sail propulsion, intercepting a large number of targets in any launch window is made possible. The mission duration was estimated at 2.5 years.

After deployment in cislunar space, NEA Scout was intended to deploy its solar panels and antenna. Following a lunar flyby, the solar sail would have deployed and spacecraft checkout would have begun. NEA Scout would then have performed a series of lunar flybys to achieve optimum departure trajectory before beginning its 2.0 – 2.5 year-long cruise to the asteroid 2020 GE.

Sail

Four 6.8 m booms were designed to deploy the single 85 m^{2} aluminized polyimide solar sail, which is 2.5 μm thick. The sail deployment mechanism was a modification of those of NanoSail and The Planetary Society's LightSail 2 spacecraft. The deployment time for the full sail was planned to be approximately 30 minutes.

Avionics

The avionics module accommodated the printed circuit boards for telecommunications, power distribution unit, command and data handling system, Sun sensors, and a miniaturized star tracker. This module also included reaction wheels, lithium batteries, and a camera. The solar sail spacecraft attitude control system consisted of three actuating subsystems: a reaction wheel control system, a reaction control system, and an adjustable mass translator system.

Propulsion

The cold gas propulsion system was situated below the solar sail and provides detumbling, initial impulsive maneuvers (required for lunar-assisted escape trajectories), and momentum management.

Communications

The spacecraft used the Iris transponder for communications in the X-band.

Power

Photovoltaic solar panels, with rechargeable batteries.

Animation of NEA Scout's planned trajectory

Around the Sun

Around the Earth before beginning cruise to 2020 GE

Around the Earth

Sun · Earth · NEA Scout · 2020 GE · Moon

== See also ==
- List of missions to minor planets

Solar sail spacecraft

- CubeSail – Planned solar sail spacecraft
- Breakthrough Starshot – Interstellar probe project
- IKAROS – First interplanetary solar sail spacecraft
- LightSail-1 – LEO solar sailing demo project
- NanoSail-D2 – Satellite designed to test concept of solar sails
- Sunjammer (spacecraft) – NASA mission intended to demonstrate a solar sail constructed by LGarde

Other deep space CubeSats

- Mars Cube One – 2018 Mars flyby mission sent with Insight

The 10 CubeSats flying in the Artemis 1 mission

- Near-Earth Asteroid Scout by NASA, a solar sail spacecraft that was planned to encounter a near-Earth asteroid (mission failure)
- BioSentinel, an astrobiology mission
- LunIR by Lockheed Martin Space
- Lunar IceCube, by the Morehead State University
- CubeSat for Solar Particles (CuSP)
- Lunar Polar Hydrogen Mapper (LunaH-Map), designed by the Arizona State University
- EQUULEUS, submitted by JAXA and the University of Tokyo
- OMOTENASHI, submitted by JAXA, a lunar lander (mission failure)
- ArgoMoon, designed by Argotec and coordinated by Italian Space Agency (ASI)
- Team Miles, by Fluid & Reason, LLC. Florida
