= IKAROS =

First interplanetary solar sail spacecraft

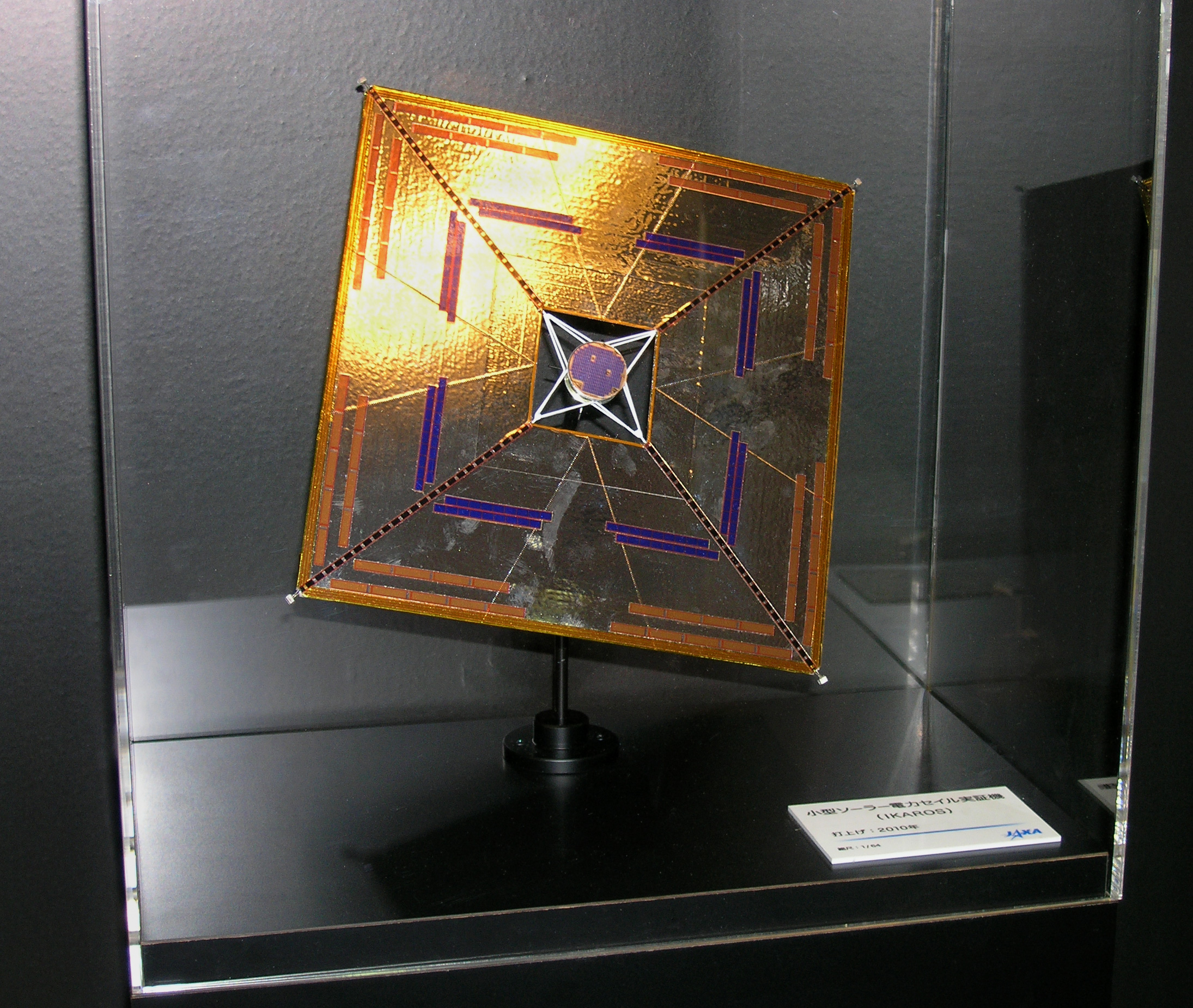
- A 1:64 scale model of the 14 m × 14 m (46 ft × 46 ft) sized IKAROS spacecraft
- Mission type: Solar sail technology
- Operator: JAXA
- COSPAR ID: 2010-020E
- SATCAT no.: 36577
- Website: global.jaxa.jp/projects/sas/ikaros/
- Mission duration: 5 years and 1 day

Spacecraft properties
- Launch mass: 310 kg
- Dimensions: Solar sail: 14 m × 14 m (46 ft × 46 ft) (area: 196 m^{2} (2,110 sq ft))

Start of mission
- Launch date: 21:58:22, 20 May 2010 (UTC)
- Rocket: H-IIA 202
- Launch site: Tanegashima, LA-Y

End of mission
- Disposal: Decommissioned
- Declared: 15 May 2025
- Last contact: 21 May 2015

Orbital parameters
- Reference system: Heliocentric orbit

Flyby of Venus
- Closest approach: 8 December 2010
- Distance: 80,800 kilometers (50,200 mi)

IKAROS (Interplanetary Kite-craft Accelerated by Radiation Of the Sun) is a Japan Aerospace Exploration Agency (JAXA) experimental spacecraft. The spacecraft was launched on 20 May 2010, aboard an H-IIA rocket, together with the Akatsuki (Venus Climate Orbiter) probe and four other small spacecraft. IKAROS is the first spacecraft to successfully demonstrate solar sail technology in interplanetary space. The craft's name is an allusion to the legendary Icarus (Ancient Greek: Ἴκαρος, Ikaros), who flew close to the Sun on wings made of bird-feathers and wax.

On 8 December 2010, IKAROS flew by Venus at a distance of 80,800 km (50,200 mi), successfully completing its planned mission, and entered its extended operation phase. Its last transmission was received in 2015. The operation was terminated officially on 15 May 2025.

== Purpose ==
The IKAROS probe was the first spacecraft to use solar sailing as the main propulsion. It was designed to demonstrate four key technologies (comments in parentheses refer to diagram below right):

1. Deployment and control of a large, thin solar sail membrane (grey-blue areas numbered 3)
2. Thin-film solar cells integrated into the sail to power the payload (black rectangles numbered 4)
3. Measurement of acceleration due to radiation pressure on the solar sail
4. Attitude control by varying the reflectance of 80 liquid crystal panels embedded in the sail (orange rectangles numbered 2)

The mission also includes investigations of aspects of interplanetary space, such as gamma-ray bursts, solar wind and cosmic dust.

The probe's ALADDIN instrument (ALDN-S and ALDN-E) measured the variation in dust density while its Gamma-Ray Burst Polarimeter (GAP) measured the polarization of gamma-ray bursts during its six-month cruise.

IKAROS was to be followed by a 40 by 40 metres (130 ft × 130 ft) sail, the Jupiter Trojan Asteroid Explorer, which was intended to journey to Jupiter and the Trojan asteroids, with a proposed goal of returning an asteroid sample to Earth in the 2050s. The Jupiter Trojan Asteroid Explorer was a finalist for Japan's Institute of Space and Astronautical Science (ISAS)' 2nd Large Mission Class. The winning mission was LiteBIRD.

== Design ==
IKAROS sail schematic diagram: 1. (blue square on a line) Tip mass 0.5 kg (1.1 lb), 1 of 4.; 2. (orange rectangle) Liquid crystal device, 1 of 80.; 3. (blue square) Membrane 7.5 μm (0.00030 in) thick, 20 metres (66 ft) on the diagonal.; 4. (black rectangle) Solar cells 25 μm (0.00098 in) thick.; 5. (yellow and blue lines) Tethers.; 6. (blue disc) Main body.; 7. (yellow dots) Instruments.

The square sail, deployed via a spinning motion using 0.5-kilogram (1.1 lb) tip masses (key item 1 in figure at right), is 20 m (66 ft) on the diagonal and is made of a 7.5-micrometre (0.00030 in) thick sheet of polyimide (key item 3 in figure at right). The polyimide sheet had a mass of about 10 grams per square metre (0.033 oz/sq ft), resulting in a total sail mass of 2 kilograms (4.4 lb), excluding tip masses, attached panels and tethers. A thin-film solar array is embedded in the sail (key item 4 in figure at right). PowerFilm, Inc. provided the thin-film solar array. Eighty blocks of LCD panels are embedded in the sail, whose reflectance can be adjusted for attitude control (key item 2 in figure at right). The sail also contains eight dust counters on the opposite face as part of the science payload.

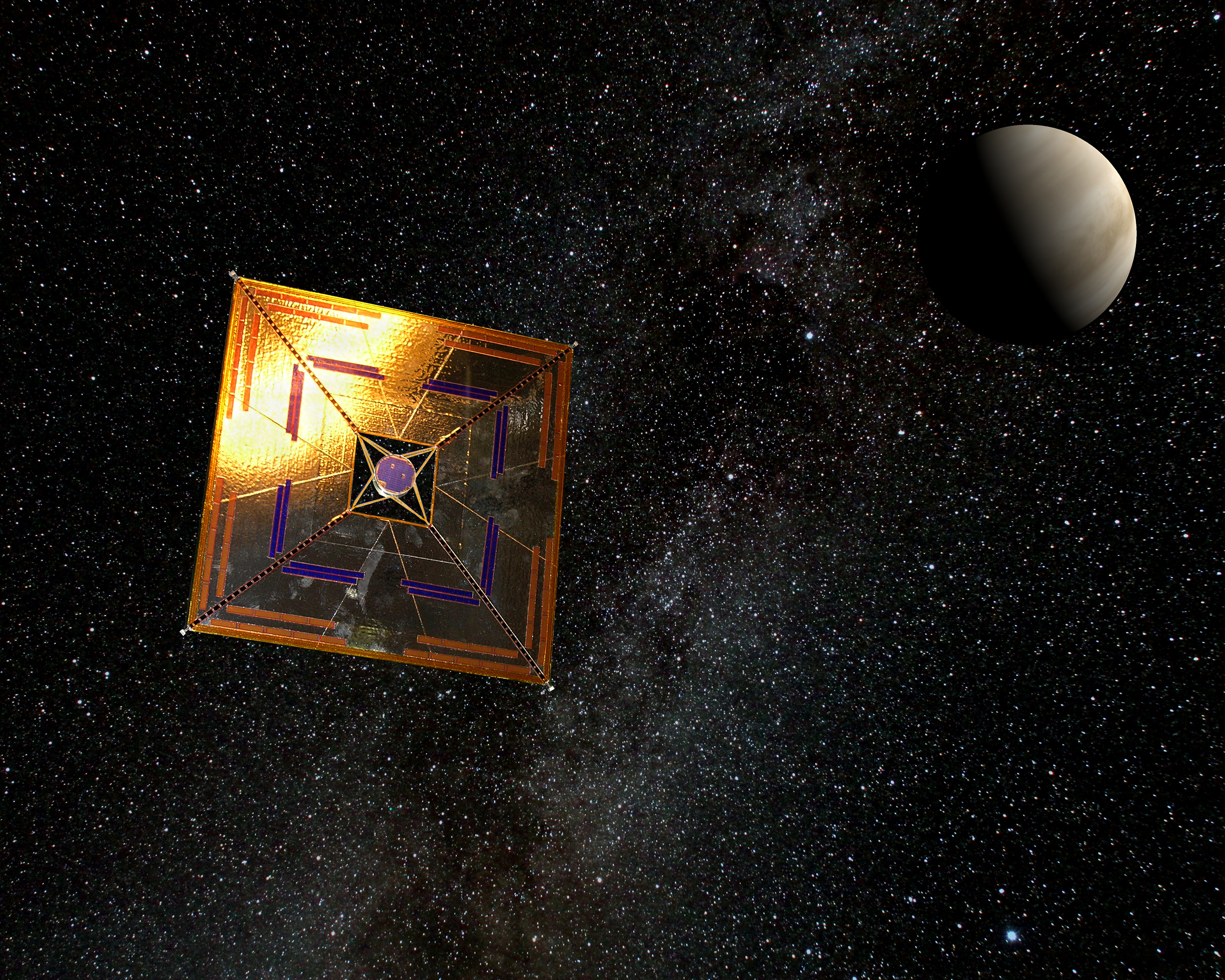
IKAROS spaceprobe in flight (artist's depiction)

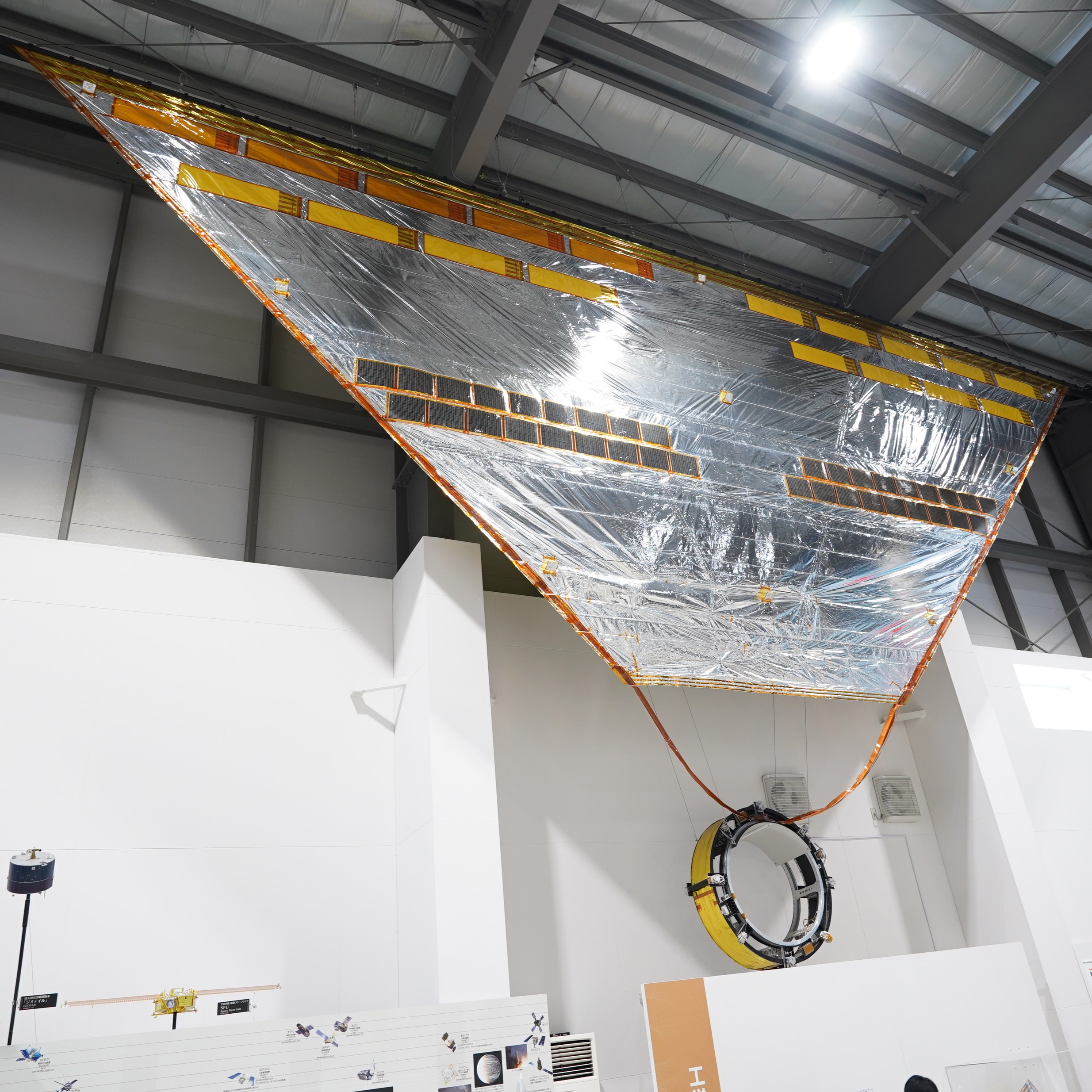
IKAROS model

== Mission progress ==
IKAROS was successfully launched together with Akatsuki (the Venus Climate Orbiter) aboard an H-IIA rocket from the Tanegashima Space Center on 21 May 2010.

IKAROS spun at 20–25 revolutions per minute and finished unfurling its sail on 10 June 2010. The craft contains two tiny ejectable cameras, DCAM1 and DCAM2. DCAM2 was used to photograph the sail after deployment on 14 July 2010.

Acceleration and attitude control (orientation) were successfully tested during the remaining six-month voyage to Venus. On 9 July 2010, JAXA confirmed that IKAROS was being accelerated by its solar sail, and on 23 July announced successful attitude control. Over a 23-hour period of time, the solar angle of the sail was changed by a half a degree, not by using thrusters, but by dynamically controlling the reflectivity of the 80 liquid crystal panels at the outer edge of the sail so that the sunlight pressure would produce torque. IKAROS continues to spin at approximately 2 rpm, requiring the LCD panels to be cycled at that rate for attitude control.

According to JAXA, IKAROS finished all planned experiments in Dec 2010, but the mission continued beyond that date "in order to enhance the skill of controlling solar sail". On 30 November 2012, JAXA announced that IKAROS had been recognized by Guinness World Records as the world's first solar sail spacecraft between planets, and that its two separated cameras, DCAM1 and DCAM2, had been recognized as the smallest size of a spacecraft flying between planets. As of 2012, the IKAROS continued to spin, but its attitude control had degraded. This resulted in unexpected sail motions and as a result, downlink through the medium-gain antenna was only intermittently available. The project team was dissolved on 28 March 2013, although a trial receipt of data was planned for a later date.

The project was reactivated on 20 June 2013 in the expectation that the satellite would wake up from a hibernation state as more power from the solar panels became available. The team was able to receive telemetry from the IKAROS between 20 June and 12 September 2013, after which contact was again lost. The loss of contact was around the predicted time of the spacecraft again entering a low-power hibernation mode as power from the solar panels decreased. Available communication time through the Usuda Deep Space Center antenna was limited, so data was gathered only intermittently to estimate the speed, trajectory and rotation of the satellite. As of August 2013, acceleration from the IKAROS sail had changed the craft's speed by approximately 400 metres per second (890 mph) in total.

Transmissions were again received on 22 May 2014, the spacecraft flying at a distance of about 230 million kilometers from the Earth. By May 2014, IKAROS was on a ten-month orbit around the Sun, spending seven months of each orbit in hibernation mode due to insufficient power. By 23 April 2015, the spacecraft woke up from hibernation mode for the 4th time and was flying at a distance of about 120 million kilometers from the Earth. On 21 May 2015, JAXA could not receive a signal from IKAROS and concluded that the spacecraft had shifted to the hibernation mode for the fifth time, as expected. Based on the last data received during May 2015, the position of IKAROS at the time was about 110 million kilometers away from the Earth, and about 130 million kilometers from the Sun.

The operation was terminated officially on 15 May 2025.

== Scientific results ==
From the gamma-ray polarization data of GAP, Toma et al. put a stricter limit on CPT violation. It is an improvement of eight orders of magnitude over previous limits.

JAXA scientists stated on 9 July 2010 that the measured thrust force by the solar radiation pressure on IKAROS' 196-square-meter (2,110 sq ft) sail is 1.12 millinewtons (0.0040 oz_{f}).

== See also ==
- CubeSail – Planned solar sail spacecraft
- CubeSail (UltraSail) – US spacecraft
- LightSail 2 – LEO solar sailing demo project
- List of missions to Venus
- Near-Earth Asteroid Scout – Solar sail spacecraft
- NanoSail-D2 – Satellite designed to test concept of solar sails
- OKEANOS – Proposed space probe to Trojan asteroids
