= Return to Rocheworld =

1993 novel by Robert L. Forward

- First edition
- Author: Robert L. Forward
- Cover artist: David Mattingly
- Language: English
- Series: Rocheworld series
- Published: 1993 (Baen Books)
- Publication place: United States
- Preceded by: Rocheworld
- Followed by: Ocean Under the Ice

Return to Rocheworld is a 1993 science fiction novel by Robert L. Forward and Julie Forward Fuller. It is the sequel to Forward's Rocheworld (also known as The Flight of the Dragonfly), a novel about the first crewed interstellar mission to a unique double planet orbiting Barnard's Star. It features a return journey to that planet by the crew of the lightsail powered Starship Prometheus.

Several new characters are introduced, including Reiki LeRoux, who makes only a brief appearance in this novel but is the main protagonist in a sequel novel, Marooned on Eden.

The Flouwen are also featured more extensively, and Flouwen culture is explored. A new species, the Gummies, is also introduced, living on the Roche lobe of the strange double planet.

The story picks up where the Rocheworld left off, but before the final chapter set years later. Major General Virginia "Jinjur" Jones leads a return journey to Rocheworld, where they set up a communication station for the flouwen to use. Having discovered that the Roche lobe of the planet is subject to periodic flooding, the explorers return there along with several Flouwen, (including one youngling who wants to be like the humans) to find that Roche also harbors not only life, but intelligence as well. They find a species which they come to call the Gummies, after their resemblance to the texture of gummi candy. These beings are related to the Flouwen of the water-covered Eau lobe, but have evolved in a completely different direction. Built to survive harsh conditions, extremes of temperature, long droughts, and competing for scarce food supplies, these elephant-sized multi-tentacled creatures are far more physical and aggressive than their aquatic ancestors. However, by the end of the novel, they have begun to develop the beginnings of a crude Stone Age technology. The Flouwen figure out how to operate the Dragonfly II Spaceplane and take several gummies back to Eau, to the objection of the humans. Finally, the humans and 3 Flouwen "littles" (Little White, Little Red, and Little Purple) lift off to explore the rest of the Barnard System.
