= Rocheworld =

1984 novel by Robert L. Forward

- Cover of the first edition
- Author: Robert L. Forward
- Original title: The Flight of the Dragonfly
- Cover artist: Gerry Daly
- Language: English
- Series: Rocheworld series
- Published: Simon & Schuster
- Publication date: April 1, 1990
- Publication place: United States
- Followed by: Return to Rocheworld

Rocheworld (first published in serial form in 1982; first book publication, under the title The Flight of the Dragonfly, 1984) is a science fiction novel by Robert Forward which depicts a realistic interstellar mission using a laser driven light sail propulsion system to send the spaceship and a crew of 20 on a one-way journey of 5.9 light-years (ca. 34 trillion miles; ca. 56 trillion km) to explore a contact binary planet that orbits Barnard's Star, which they call Rocheworld, and where they make many startling discoveries.

It had four sequels, written in collaboration with Julie Forward Fuller and Margaret Dodson Forward, which detail the exploration of the other worlds in the Barnard System: Return to Rocheworld, Marooned on Eden, Ocean Under the Ice, and Rescued from Paradise.

== Plot ==
A small group of civilian and military personnel carries out humanity's first crewed mission to another star system. They embark on a one-way exploratory mission to Barnard's Star, where planets have been discovered by a robot probe. They travel in a laser-driven light sail spacecraft christened Prometheus. The journey lasts 40 years, but the crew uses a drug called "No-Die," which slows their aging process, whilst lowering their effective I.Q. and emotional state to that of small children. They arrive only a decade physically older than when they left. They are cared for during this period by the ship's AI computer.

At Barnard they begin their exploration, moving around the system and deploying various robot probes. Part of the crew then uses a lander to visit the contact binary planet Rocheworld, which consists of a solid-surface lobe they call Roche (French for rock as well as the name of the French mathematician who worked on Roche limits) and an ammonia/water-covered lobe they call Eau (French for water). A subset of the landing party journeys to Eau in the space-plane Dragonfly, which was carried on the lander. Over Eau the Dragonfly is caught in a violent storm that forces it to ditch. Unable to take off, the crew uses the plane's lift fans as propellers to make their way to the inner pole of the double planet, where the gravitation from Roche will help them to break free and return to the lander.

While making this journey, the Dragonfly attracts the attention of one of the native species of the planet: the very intelligent but non-technological Flouwen. The Flouwen and the AI aboard the Dragonfly establish communications; the AI brings the Flouwen and the crew into contact and the two species begin to exchange cultural and scientific knowledge. The crew witnesses the birth of a Flouwen youngling, while one crew member takes a ride on a Flouwen who is fascinated by human technology.

The Flouwen realize the humans are travelling to the pole and warn them that they are approaching a period where the configuration of the planetary system will cause the ocean on Eau to partially flow to Roche. They try to stop the humans from continuing into this violent event by pinning the spacecraft to the ocean floor with ice as ballast (water ice sinks in the ammonia-water solution of the ocean). The humans then realize that the interplanetary waterfall poses a threat to the lander crew remaining on Roche. Fortunately, the tidal stresses cause nearby dormant volcanoes to become active again. This melts an underwater glacier and floods the area with warm water, upon which the ice floats off the plane. The crew manages to get airborne and return to Roche. They rendezvous with the lander just as water is reaching it, and the entire landing party makes it back to the Prometheus.

An epilogue is set many years later, when a follow-on mission arrives from Earth and is met by the sole surviving crew member, the others having died in accidents or from old age. This episode is expanded in the last sequel novel, Rescued from Paradise.

== Forward's light sail propulsion system ==
The light sail system consists of three functional parts: a powerful laser, a large focusing lens, and a giant space-sail. The idea behind the solar sail is that the laser provides a small force on the sail when the sail reflects the light. This small force provides the acceleration of the spaceship. With the ship's primary source of energy coming from the outside, it is not limited to traveling distances that it had enough fuel for.

The light used in the system is from an array of a thousand laser generators, which are focused through lenses and aimed at the sail. The lasers provided up to 1,500 terawatts of power. Two different lenses were used to magnify the laser beams. The acceleration lens is 100 km in diameter and is able to accelerate the ship at 0.01g; the deceleration lens is 300 km in diameter and is able to decelerate the ship at 0.1g. Although these accelerations are relatively small, over time they result in enormous speeds.

To catch the energy, Forward uses a 1,000-km-diameter circular aluminum sail. The sail resembles a flattened disk with a 300-km-diameter removable center portion. When traveling to Rocheworld, the entire sail is used. When the ship needs to decelerate, the smaller sail is separated from the larger outer sail. The large sail is used as a reflecting lens, focusing light onto the smaller sail, slowing the craft.

Using the light sail system, the spaceship Prometheus accelerates for 20 years, traveling 2 light years' distance toward Barnard's Star before going into coast mode and traveling an additional 20 years' time at a constant speed of 0.2 c, covering the remaining 4 light years (ca. 23 trillion miles; 38 trillion km).

== Flouwen ==
Flouwen (the Middle English word for 'flow') are the alien creatures in the book. They are the sole intelligent inhabitants of the planet Eau, which makes up the watery half of Rocheworld. Flouwen are blob-like happy-go-lucky aliens that spend their days surfing waves and working on difficult mathematical problems.

Flouwen appear to be giant, colored jellyfish-like entities in the ammonia oceans of Eau. They look like colored blobs of jelly, but they can change their shape at will. They are highly intelligent, sexless, and do not appear to physically age. They are able to communicate and see in the water by means of sonar. A Flouwen named Clear◊White◊Whistle, described as trying to "invent" physics and astronomy, discovers a way to see outside the water by morphing its jelly body into a crude lens. He teaches the method to the others and they use it to methodically track the stars. Flouwen are also capable of morphing themselves into a hard rock-like substance when they feel the need to think about a difficult problem for an extended period. They do this by expelling much of their body water, thereby bringing their silica-gel-based cells closer together, which allows quicker processing of information.

Flouwen can grow quite large over time. This excess bulk can be shed during a type of breeding in which large Flouwen gather in a circle and spin off pieces of themselves to create a new Flouwen. Because they are created out of indistinguishable pieces of their parents, they are born fairly intelligent. One of the aliens, Warm@Amber@Resonance, is said to be over five hundred Eau seasons in age. Warm@Amber@Resonance speaks of other Flouwen that are much older than it, such as Sour#Sapphire#Coo.

Flouwen possess mathematical abilities far exceeding our own. Despite their intellect, they lack any desire to make real use of it, other than to work on math problems or to study the stars; they just don't see the point in studying anything else. They do not have any concept of technology. They refer to the Dragonfly as a "giant talking rock" and name it "Floating Rock".

Flouwen do not appear to have a strong social structure. They tend to treat one another equally, though mathematics proficiency appears to confer a heightened social status. Roaring☆Hot☆Vermillion is described as the nominal leader of the Flouwen pod encountered in this novel, though some other Flouwen are equal to it in status. While younger Flouwen seem to have large amounts of free time, their elders spend long periods of time in rock form, contemplating and solving mathematical problems. The older Flouwen often hold higher social status as a result of their perceived higher knowledge in mathematics.

Although Flouwen do not seem to physically age, they reveal that it's possible that their ages are reflected in the amount of time they spend contemplating in rock form. Perhaps the actual population of the Flouwen is much larger than it appears, because there are many off working on problems. Some may never find solutions to their problems, so they will never return, thus completing their life cycle. The Flouwens' time to solve a problem is limited because they slowly weather away as time passes.

Flouwen are also capable of splitting off sections of themselves which continue to function as sentient beings. Three of these Flouwen buds assist the humans in exploring the rest of the Barnard system in the sequels.

== Rocheworld shape ==
Rocheworld is a double planet in which the two elements are close enough that they share an atmosphere. Each element is also deformed into an egg shape by the gravity of the other.

== James (the Christmas Bush) ==
Rocheworld's human explorers are aided by the Dragonfly's artificial intelligence system, James. The physical extension of James is the Christmas Bush. The Christmas Bush is both a modular robot and a bush robot which both communicates through and is powered by a network of laser transceivers on its body. The Christmas Bush is similar to some recursive fractal structures where the large scale shape of the robot is repeated a number of times in progressively smaller size. A main rod divides into six smaller jointed rods which also divide into six. This is repeated again and again so that the Christmas Bush can manipulate both large and small objects. The end of each rod is where the laser transceivers are located. The "Christmas Bush" nickname for the robot is given because it has a bushy texture and is lit up like a Christmas tree when all the rods are fully expanded.

Each rod and its children rods can separate from its parent rod and each carries a certain amount of computational power. The Bush or its pieces move by crawling while experiencing acceleration due to gravity or thrust, or by flying in low gravity environments. To fly, the smallest rods work together like the cilia of single celled organisms to provide thrust in any direction. The cilia also allow James to play audio and record sound through the bush.

The crew all wear a small piece of James (referred to as an imp) near their ear, which allows them to communicate with James and the other crew members. James will always keep some portion of the imp in contact with the crew's skin to allow it to monitor their health by recording their temperature, pulse, etc.

== Publication history ==
Rocheworld was first published in slightly shorter form as a serial in Analog Science Fiction and Fact magazine in December 1982 through February 1983. (Cover image with illustration by Rick Sternbach available here .) It won the Analog "Analytical Laboratory" award for Best Serial Novel or Novella in 1983. The first book version, slightly lengthened, came out under the title Flight of the Dragonfly from Timescape Books (a publishing line of Pocket Books/Simon and Schuster). A Baen Books paperback edition in 1985, also titled Flight of the Dragonfly was slightly lengthened. The British version was published by New English Library in their "SF Master Series" in 1985. A revised and lengthened version was released in 1990 from Baen Books under the original title Rocheworld, marked "At Last The Complete Story!". This version added several subplots which were not present in previous editions.

Four sequels, written in collaboration with Forward's family members Julie Forward Fuller and Martha Dodson Forward, were published in 1993, 1994, and 1995. They followed the continuity of the 1990 edition, and introduced new characters and settings.

== Reception ==
Dave Langford reviewed The Flight of the Dragonfly for White Dwarf #68, and stated that "It's a shame that with all this seething behind his marble brow, Forward never put across the drama and visual excitement of the events he's calculated to the eleventh decimal place. As in much SF by scientists, the most interesting characters are the computers."

== Reviews ==
- Review by Dan Chow (1984) in Locus, #277 February 1984
- Review by Russell Letson (1984) in Fantasy Review, August 1984
- Review by Robert Coulson (1985) in Amazing Stories, March 1985
- Review by Roland J. Green (1985) in Far Frontiers, Volume III/Fall 1985
- Review [French] by Roland C. Wagner (1986) in Fiction, #376
- Review by Norm Hartman (1990) in Science Fiction Review, Summer 1990

== See also ==
- List of underwater science fiction works
- Roche lobe for an explanation of the underlying gravitational principle.
- Correspondence between Forward and Hans Moravec regarding the use of Moravec's bush robot in the novel.
