= Bush robot =

Hypothetical machine whose body branches in a fractal way

A bush robot is a hypothetical machine whose body branches in a fractal way into trillions of nanoscale fingers, to achieve very high dexterity and reconfigurability. The concept was described by Hans Moravec in a final report for NASA in 1999, who projected that development of the necessary technology will take half a century.

Bush robots are also referenced as very recent technology in the Transhuman Space and Eclipse Phase roleplaying games. They are also featured in some novels, such as Rocheworld by physicist Robert L. Forward, Iron Sunrise and Singularity Sky by Charles Stross, Matter by Iain M. Banks, The Turing Option by Harry Harrison and artificial intelligence expert Marvin Minsky, The Return of Bruce Wayne #6 by Grant Morrison and Lee Garbett, The Big Chill by Alan Moore and Carlos D'Anda (as the last form of life in the universe) and The Adventures of Lando Calrissian by L. Neil Smith. Bush robots also play an important role in Ken Macleod's The Cassini Division, part of his science-fiction series The Fall Revolution.

The utility robots in the movie Interstellar (film) were fractal designs similar to a Moravec bush, but with only five levels of bifurcation.

== See also ==
- Utility fog
