= Rescued from Paradise =

1995 novel by Robert L. Forward

- Cover of the first edition
- Author: Robert L. Forward
- Cover artist: David Mattingly
- Language: English
- Series: Rocheworld series
- Published: 1995
- Publisher: Baen Books
- Publication place: United States
- Preceded by: Marooned on Eden

Rescued from Paradise is a science fiction novel by Robert L. Forward, collaborating with his daughter Julie Forward Fuller. It is part of the Rocheworld series, about an expedition to explore planets found in orbit around Barnard's Star. This is the fifth and final book in the continuity. Some material from previous novels was rewritten and included as part of this story. In this novel, after settling down on the habitable moon Zuni (now known as Eden), the crew struggle to survive various disasters and to communicate with a mysterious Civilization under the ocean.

== Plot ==
The first interstellar expedition successfully reached Barnard's Star and its double-planet Rocheworld and made contact with the flouwen, intelligent aquatic beings with a talent for higher mathematics and a love of surfing. The flouwen joined with the humans to explore the rest of Barnard's planets and moons. When a landing craft carrying ten humans and three flouwen crashlanded on a habitable moon—Eden—the team was marooned on Eden with no hope of rescue until decades later when a second expedition was scheduled from Earth.

Not having any other option, the marooned explorers settled down to make the moon their home, befriending the indigenous inhabitants, the Jollys, exploring, learning to live off the land, and, most important, raising families. They struggled to survive natural disasters and unexpected attacks from the sea. Meanwhile, a strange tablet seems to show evidence of intelligent life beneath the ocean. The years pass... Crew members die, but many children are born.

A new generation grows up hearing of Earth and its technology as a dim legend, and thinking of Eden as their natural home. The attacks from the sea are discovered to have come from an intelligent and aquatic species, the "weresharks" and not to have been on purpose. But communication proves to be difficult when it is discovered that the Flouwen are responsible for the Death of Steadfast Defender, a wereshark who was just trying to communicate. However, this misunderstanding is eventually resolved and the weresharks accept the so-called "Slimedevils".

When the Second Expedition finally arrives, its leader announces that he has orders to rescue all the survivors. But many do not want to leave, considering Eden their home.

With the help of George G. Gudunov (now promoted to General) a compromise is reached.
