= The Medusa Chronicles =

2016 novel by Alastair Reynolds and Stephen Baxter

- Author: Alastair Reynolds; Stephen Baxter
- Language: English
- Genre: Science fiction
- Publisher: Gollancz
- Publication date: May 2016
- Publication place: United Kingdom
- Media type: Print (hardcover)
- Pages: 336 (hardcover)
- ISBN: 978 147 321 0189
- Preceded by: A Meeting with Medusa

The Medusa Chronicles is a 2016 science fiction novel by Alastair Reynolds and Stephen Baxter, a sequel to Arthur C. Clarke's 1971 novella A Meeting with Medusa.

== Plot ==
The novel expands on the premise of Clarke's story, taking the main character into the distant future, while also going into the past to show that both the novel and the original Clarke story are set in an alternative history where in 1968, NASA and the Soviet space program united to prevent an asteroid from impacting Earth.

== Reception ==
A reviewer of Publishers Weekly stated "The novel’s reach does come at the expense of some psychological depth, but fans of the authors’ other work won’t be disappointed." Allen Stroud of SF Book Review mentioned "The Medusa Chronicles is an excellent read, continuing where Clarke left its principal character and expanding his ideas in a way that pays homage but also expresses the gift of the two writers who have chosen to take their pens to this future fiction world".
