= Robert L. Forward =

American physicist and writer (1932–2002)

- Born: August 15, 1932; Geneva, New York, U.S.
- Died: September 21, 2002 (aged 70); Seattle, Washington, U.S.
- Education: University of Maryland; UCLA
- Known for: Statite
- Spouse: Martha Dodson (1954–2002; his death)
- Children: Robert Dodson Forward; Mary Lois Mattlin; Julie Elizabeth Fuller; Eve Laurel Forward
- Scientific career
- Fields: Physicist
- Institutions: Hughes Aircraft; Tethers Unlimited, Inc.
- Thesis: Detectors for Dynamic Gravitational Fields (1965)
- Doctoral advisor: Joseph Weber; David Mandeen Zipoy

Robert Lull Forward (August 15, 1932 – September 21, 2002) was an American physicist and science fiction writer. His literary work was noted for its scientific credibility and use of ideas developed from his career as an aerospace engineer. He also made important contributions to gravitational wave detection research.

== Biography ==
Forward earned his doctorate from the University of Maryland in 1965, with a thesis entitled Detectors for Dynamic Gravitational Fields, for the development of a bar antenna for the detection of gravitational radiation.

=== Career and research ===
He then went to work at the research labs of Hughes Aircraft, where he continued his research on gravity measurement and received 18 patents. He took early retirement in 1987, to focus on his fiction writing and consulting for such clients as NASA and the U.S. Air Force. In 1994, he co-founded the company Tethers Unlimited, Inc. with Robert P. Hoyt, where he served as chief scientist and chairman until 2002.

Much of his research focused on the leading edges of speculative physics but was always grounded in what he believed humans could accomplish. He worked on such projects as space tethers and space fountains, solar sails (including Starwisp), antimatter propulsion, and other spacecraft propulsion technologies, and did further research on more esoteric possibilities such as time travel and negative matter. He was issued a patent for the statite, and contributed to a concept to drain the Van Allen Belts.

==== Forward Mass Detector ====
Forward's extensive work in the field of gravitational wave detection included the invention of the rotating cruciform gravity gradiometer or 'Forward Mass Detector', for Lunar Mascon (mass concentration) measurements. The gravity gradiometer is described in the well-known textbook Gravitation by Misner, Thorne & Wheeler. The principle behind it is quite simple; getting the implementation right is tricky. Essentially, two beams are crossed over and connected with an axle through their crossing point. They are held at right angles to each other by springs. They have heavy masses at the ends of the beams, and the whole assembly spun around the common axle at high speed. The angle between the beams is measured continuously, and if it varies with a period half that of the rotation period, it means that the detector is experiencing a measurable gravitational field gradient.

==== Vacuum Fluctuation Battery ====
In 1984, Forward published his theoretical design for a "Casimir battery", utilizing the electromagnetic Zero-point energy and the attractive force associated. The Casimir force would pull the plates together, if the plates were charged with same polarity and the electrostatic force applied to the plates is adjusted. The Casimir force will pull the plates together increasing the electric field between each plate and producing a voltage. The battery could be "recharged" by increasing the electrostatic force, pushing the plates apart.

=== Fiction ===
In addition to more than 200 papers and articles, he published 11 novels. Critics' reviews were mixed, always praising the science concepts and the aliens he created, but often finding the plots thin and the humans shallow. His treatment of hard-science topics in fictional form is highly reminiscent of the work of Hal Clement. He described his first novel, Dragon's Egg, as "a textbook on neutron star physics disguised as a novel." His novel Rocheworld describes a double-planet system with a single shared atmosphere and ocean, and a beam-powered propulsion interstellar space ship to get there. Forward co-authored two Rocheworld novels with his wife, Martha Dodson Forward, and two additional Rocheworld novels with his second daughter, Julie Fuller. Forward also helped Larry Niven calculate the parameters of the Smoke Ring for his novel The Integral Trees. Much of his scientific research in speculative physics serves as inspiration for science fiction, many of his ideas on Zero-point energy, Interstellar travel and propulsion can be found in contemporary and modern scientific fiction.

=== Personal life ===
Forward's son, Bob Forward, has led a successful career as a storyboard artist and writer in television animation, including in He-Man and the Masters of the Universe, The Legend of Zelda, and most famously, Beast Wars. He is also the author of two novels, The Owl and The Owl 2: Scarlet Serenade.

Forward's daughter, Eve Forward, is also a writer, known for her two novels Villains by Necessity and Animist.

=== Death ===
In 2001, Forward received a diagnosis of terminal cancer. He died on September 21, 2002.

== Publications ==
=== Selected scientific works ===
- Forward, Robert L. (15 January 1978). "Wideband laser-interferometer gravitational-radiation experiment". Physical Review D. 17 (2): 379–390. Bibcode:1978PhRvD..17..379F. doi:10.1103/PhysRevD.17.379.
- Forward, Robert L. (15 August 1982). "Flattening spacetime near the Earth". Physical Review D. 26 (4): 735–744. Bibcode:1982PhRvD..26..735F. doi:10.1103/PhysRevD.26.735.
- Cramer, John G.; Forward, Robert L.; Morris, Michael S.; Visser, Matt; Benford, Gregory; Landis, Geoffrey A. (15 March 1995). "Natural wormholes as gravitational lenses". Physical Review D. 51 (6): 3117–3120. arXiv:astro-ph/9409051. Bibcode:1995PhRvD..51.3117C. doi:10.1103/PhysRevD.51.3117. PMID 10018782. S2CID 42837620.
- Forward, Robert L.; Berman, David (12 June 1967). "Gravitational-Radiation Detection Range for Binary Stellar Systems". Physical Review Letters. 18 (24): 1071–1074. Bibcode:1967PhRvL..18.1071F. doi:10.1103/PhysRevLett.18.1071.
- Forward, Robert L. (15 August 1984). "Extracting electrical energy from the vacuum by cohesion of charged foliated conductors". Physical Review B. 30 (4): 1700–1702. Bibcode:1984PhRvB..30.1700F. doi:10.1103/PhysRevB.30.1700.
- Forward, Robert (January 1, 1999). "Apparent Endless Extraction of Energy from the Vacuum by Cyclic Manipulation of Casimir Cavity Dimensions". ntrs.nasa.gov.

=== Dragon's Egg series ===
1. Dragon's Egg (1980)
2. Starquake (1985)

Both collected in an omnibus edition Dragon's Egg & Starquake (1994)

=== Rocheworld series ===
1. Rocheworld (Baen, 1990) 155,000 words, originally published in these iterations:

Rocheworld (1981) original manuscript, 150,000 words
Rocheworld (Analog, 1982) 60,000 words
The Flight of the Dragonfly (Timescape, 1984) hardcover, ~100,000 words
The Flight of the Dragonfly (Baen, 1985) paperback, 110,000 words

2. Return to Rocheworld (1993) with Julie Forward Fuller
3. Marooned on Eden (1993) with Martha Dodson Forward (Note: Baen Books mistakenly put "Margaret Dodson Forward" instead of "Martha Dodson Forward" on the cover of the book. The title page in the book has her name correctly as "Martha".)
4. Ocean Under the Ice (1994) with Martha Dodson Forward
5. Rescued from Paradise (1995) with Julie Forward Fuller

=== Novels ===
- Martian Rainbow (1991)
- Timemaster (1992)
- Camelot 30K (1993)
- Saturn Rukh (1997)

=== Collection (contains both fiction and essays) ===
- Indistinguishable from Magic (1995)

=== Non-fiction ===
- Mirror Matter: Pioneering Antimatter Physics (1988) with Joel Davis
- Future Magic (1988) This book discusses possible future applications of Skyhooks and orbital rings amongst other technologies, including a plan by Hughes Aircraft for a potential flying saucer.

Forward also wrote many articles in scientific journals and filed many patents, mainly while working for Hughes Aircraft.

== See also ==
- Starwisp, an ultralightweight interstellar probe proposed by Forward in 1985
- "Left to Right", a short story by Isaac Asimov featuring Forward
