= Saturn Rukh =

1997 science fiction novel by Robert L. Forward

Cover of the first edition, published by Tor. Cover art by Bob Eggleton. This art does not depict the rukhs, but rather a related species.

Saturn Rukh is a hard science fiction novel written by the United States physicist Robert L. Forward. It was first published in hardcover in March 1997 (and later in paperback in 1998) by Tor Books. Saturn Rukh is themed around human contact with alien organisms on the gaseous planet Saturn. Like many of Forward's books, the novel is a speculation of the nature of intelligent life in a non-Terran ecosystem, in this case the atmosphere of a gas giant.

== Plot summary ==
In an unspecified time in the future, a multi-national consortium sends six astronauts to Saturn to establish a helium mining factory to produce stabilized metastable helium ("meta"), a powerful rocket fuel, in the planet's upper atmosphere. If completed properly, each aeronaut will receive a billion dollars. With only enough "meta" to get them to Saturn, failure will cost them their lives. And all too soon the crew of astronauts crash-lands on a surface, which is actually the back of an enormous alien lifeform resembling a stingray in shape. They dub the bizarre creature that moves through Saturn's gaseous upper atmosphere "the Rukh". The creature is 4 kilometers long and has two brains, both male and female. When part of their apparatus is swallowed by one of these giant birdlike beings, the crew needs to find a way to communicate and to be able to cooperate with the Rukhs so that they may survive.

== See also ==
- A Meeting with Medusa
- The Algebraist
