= Eve Forward =

American novelist

- Born: Eve Laurel Forward; January 17, 1972 (age 54); California
- Occupations: Author, screenwriter
- Writing career
- Genre: Fantasy
- Notable work: Villains by Necessity

Eve Forward (born January 17, 1972) is an American author and television screenwriter. She is the daughter of American physicist and popular science fiction author Robert L. Forward, and the sister of Bob Forward, also a writer and film director.

Forward lives in the Island County, Washington area. She is solitary. In addition to writing, she was a painter of miniatures for WOTC, contributing to the D&D Miniatures game as well as Dreamblade and Star Wars Miniatures lines.

She also did some writing, and noises, for Diablo: Hellfire.

She also used to customize model horses.

== Books ==
- Villains by Necessity (Tor Books, 1995)
- Animist (Tor, 2000)
- GyreWorld: Book One – The Turning City (Detonation Films, 2015) by Forward with her brother Bob Forward as co-author

== Television ==
- The Legend of Zelda (1989)
- GI Joe: A Real American Hero (1991)
- Hammerman (1991)
- Biker Mice from Mars (1993–1994)
