= Ocean Under the Ice =

1994 novel by Robert L. Forward

- Cover of the first edition
- Author: Robert L. Forward and Martha Dodson Forward
- Cover artist: David Mattingly
- Language: English
- Series: Rocheworld series
- Published: 1994
- Publisher: Baen Books
- Publication place: United States
- Preceded by: Return to Rocheworld
- Followed by: Marooned on Eden

Ocean Under the Ice is a science fiction novel by Robert L. Forward, written in collaboration with his wife, Martha Dodson Forward. It is part of the Rocheworld series, about an expedition to explore planets found in orbit around Barnard's Star. It was written after Marooned on Eden, but is before it in the continuity. This is the third book in the continuity. It follows the crew of humans and Flouwen as they explore Zulu, a moon of the gas planet Gargantua, and encounter 2 sentient species, the icerugs and the coelasharks.
