= A Meeting with Medusa =

1971 science fiction novella by Arthur C. Clarke

- Short story by Arthur C. Clarke
- Cover to a paperback version
- Country: United Kingdom
- Language: English
- Genre: Science fiction

Publication
- Published in: Playboy
- Publication type: Magazine
- Publication date: December 1971

Chronology
—	The Medusa Chronicles

A Meeting with Medusa is a science fiction novella by British writer Arthur C. Clarke. It was originally published in 1971 and has since been included in the anthology Nebula Award Stories Eight as well as several collections of Clarke's writings.

A sequel, The Medusa Chronicles, was published in 2016 as a collaborative effort between Alastair Reynolds and Stephen Baxter.

== Plot summary ==
Taking place partly on Earth and partly in the atmosphere of Jupiter, the story tells of Howard Falcon, the captain of a new and experimental giant-sized helium-filled airship. When an accident causes the ship to crash, Falcon is badly injured and takes over a year to fully recover.

Later, Falcon promotes an expedition to explore the atmosphere of Jupiter. After several years and many trials, the expedition is launched, with Falcon at the controls of the Kon-Tiki, a hot-hydrogen balloon-supported craft that descends through the upper atmosphere of Jupiter.

As the craft descends through the various cloud layers, Falcon discovers that the atmosphere supports at least two large forms of life, as well as microscopic and bioluminescent air plankton, producing atmospheric sea-fire. One form is a giant jellyfish-like creature (the Medusa of the title) about a mile across, and the others are manta ray-like creatures about a hundred yards wide that apparently prey on the Medusa.

The Medusa begins to show an interest in the Kon-Tiki, and for his own and the expedition's safety, Falcon ignites his emergency power and escapes back into the upper atmosphere.

After his return, it is revealed to the reader that because of the airship accident much of Falcon's body was replaced by prosthetics, making him a cyborg with increased speed and reactions - allowing him to venture further into deep space than anyone, while leaving him feeling distanced from other humans.

== Influence ==
The story was the inspiration for The Medusa Encounter, the fourth novel in the Venus Prime series by Paul Preuss.

The concept of life on Jupiter was explored in the second episode of Carl Sagan's 1980 PBS series Cosmos, which featured lifeforms similar in concept to those in this story.

Clarke himself revisited the notion of giant lifeforms in the atmosphere of Jupiter in his 1982 novel 2010: Odyssey Two.

Ben Bova's 2011 novel Leviathans of Jupiter, part of his Grand Tour series, features giant creatures called "Clarke's Medusas" living in the planet's atmosphere.

== Awards ==
- 1972 - Nebula Award for Best Novella, winner.
- 1974 - Seiun Award for Best Foreign Language Short Story.

== See also ==
- Saturn Rukh
