= Marooned on Eden =

1993 novel by Robert L. Forward

- Cover of the first edition
- Author: Robert L. Forward
- Cover artist: David Mattingly
- Language: English
- Series: Rocheworld series
- Published: 1993 (Baen Books)
- Publication place: United States
- Preceded by: Ocean Under the Ice
- Followed by: Rescued from Paradise

Marooned on Eden (1993), is a science fiction novel by Robert L. Forward, collaborating with his wife, Martha Dodson Forward.

It is part of the Rocheworld series, about an expedition to explore planets found in orbit around Barnard's Star. It was written before Ocean Under the Ice, but is after it in the continuity. This is the fourth book in the continuity. It is written from the perspective of crewmember Reiki LeRoux and revolves around the crew struggling to survive on the habitable moon Zuni after a crash landing maroons them there. The crew nevertheless do their best to continue the mission without technology, learning to communicate with the moon's inhabitants and eventually building a home and raising families. It is the only book in the series written from a first person perspective.

== Characters in Marooned on Eden ==
=== Crew ===
The initial crew of the Barnard's Star Expedition consisted of twenty people when it left the solar system in 2026. One of the crew, Dr. William Wang, during the long process of curing the rest of the crew from an infectious type of cancer, died from the same cancer while en route to Barnard. Although the crew spent forty calendar years traveling from the solar system to Barnard's Star, their aging rate during the long journey was slowed by a factor of four by the use of the drug No-Die. As a result, upon the arrival at Barnard in 2066, the effective biological age of the crew had only increased ten years over their age at the start of the mission. The crew spent the next two years decelerating to a halt in the Barnard planetary system, then three years surveying the entire system from space, exploring the two lobes of the double-planet Rocheworld, and exploring the surface of the Gargantuan moon Zulu, before moving on to the surface exploration of Zuni. The ages for the humans are given in terms of their effective biological age at the time of their crash landing on Zuni, now known as Eden, in 2073.

=== Major General Virginia "Jinjur" Jones ===
Commander of the Barnard's Star Expedition.

== Aliens: 'Jolly Blue-Green Giants' ==
The 'Jolly Green Giants', as named by the humans, are large, intelligent, tree-like creatures. They use some tools, such as knives, and move very slowly as compared to the humans.
The 'Jollies' use six hydraulically operated roots to move, walking by holding the front middle and left and right rear roots on the ground and moving the other three roots forward. They then hold those to the ground and move the front middle and left and right rear roots forward, then repeating the process. They are said to look slightly like palm trees by George, when a picture is sent to him aboard the Prometheus.

=== Eyes ===
The 'Jolly Green Giants' have eyes that are very birdlike, in that they can fly. They are not permanently attached to the main body, but need to come back to it for guidance, nourishment, and to 'transfer' the 'data' they have gathered while flying around. The main body provides them with guidance, as is seen in the book, when the main body of the plant gives them flight patterns.
They have large brains, and almost no digestive system. They are feathered, and have a hole in their head that is used for 'data transfer', and getting nourishment. They have a single large eye. It was shown in the book that they can remain in the 'nest', and look out, acting like human eyes, in that they provide a 'live feed' of information.

=== Gatherers ===
The gatherers of the 'Jolly Green Giants' have systems very like that of the eyes, but serve a different purpose. They are used as the hands for the gatherer, and are for more delicate tasks than the 'roots' of the main body can perform. they are also used for speaking, as they are the only part of the 'Jollies' that can generate a sound suitable for the purpose.

== See also ==
- Roche lobe for an explanation of the underlying gravitational principle.
- Rocheworld
