= Villains by Necessity =

1995 novel by Eve Forward

- Cover of first edition (hardcover)
- Author: Eve Forward
- Cover artist: Darrell K. Sweet
- Language: English
- Genre: Fantasy novel
- Publisher: Tor Books
- Publication date: 1995
- Publication place: United States
- Media type: Print (Hardcover & Paperback)
- Pages: 446 pages

Villains by Necessity is a fantasy novel written by Eve Forward.

== Synopsis ==
Over a century after the ultimate triumph of good over evil, the world's last assassin and the world's last thief discover from a druid that, without more evil, the world will be destroyed. With the help of an evil sorceress and a black knight, the party sets out to save it from the misguided forces of good.

== Reception ==
Kirkus Reviews called it "frothy and ingenious", and praised its "agreeable, mildly humorous streak", but ultimately judged it "unsuspenseful and too long". At the Silver Reviews, Steven H Silver considered it to have been "ambitious", but too reminiscent of a Dungeons & Dragons campaign, with "anachronistic" humor, and evil characters whose evilness lacks "any real depth".
