= Hans Moravec =

Austrian-Canadian roboticist and futurist (born 1948)

- Born: Hans Peter Moravec; November 30, 1948 (age 77); Kautzen, Allied-occupied Austria
- Education: Acadia University (BSc); University of Western Ontario (MSc); Stanford University (PhD)
- Known for: Moravec's corner detector Moravec's paradox Bush robot Occupancy grid mapping Quantum suicide and immortality Rotating skyhook Rotovator; Stanford Cart
- Scientific career
- Fields: Computer science, robotics, artificial intelligence
- Workplaces: Carnegie Mellon University; Stanford University
- Thesis: Obstacle avoidance and navigation in the real world by a seeing robot rover (1980)
- Doctoral advisor: John McCarthy
- Doctoral students: Richard Wallace

Hans Peter Moravec (born November 30, 1948) is an Austrian-born Canadian computer scientist and an adjunct faculty member at the Robotics Institute of Carnegie Mellon University in Pittsburgh, U.S. He is known for his work on robotics, artificial intelligence, and writings on the impact of technology. Moravec also is a futurist with many of his publications and predictions focusing on transhumanism. Moravec developed techniques in computer vision for determining the region of interest (ROI) in a scene.

== Career ==
Moravec attended Loyola College in Montreal for two years and transferred to Acadia University, where he received his BSc in mathematics in 1969. He received his MSc in computer science in 1971 from the University of Western Ontario. He then earned a PhD in computer science from Stanford University in 1980 for a TV-equipped robot which was remotely controlled by a large computer (the Stanford Cart). The robot was able to negotiate cluttered obstacle courses. Another achievement in robotics was the discovery of new approaches for robot spatial representation such as 3D occupancy grids. He also developed the idea of bush robots.

Moravec joined the newly established Robotics Institute at Carnegie Mellon in 1980 as a research scientist, becoming research professor in 1995. He has been an adjunct professor at the institute since 2005.

Moravec was a cofounder of Seegrid Corporation of Pittsburgh, Pennsylvania, in 2003, which is a robotics company with one of its goals being to develop a fully autonomous robot capable of navigating its environment without human intervention.

He is also somewhat known for his work on space tethers.

== Futurism ==
=== Predictions ===
Hans Moravec has made some concrete predictions as to the future of intelligence, by estimating the computational cost (measured in instructions per second) of various operations of human intelligence, and comparing it with the future of computer computational power as predicted by Moore's law.

In When will computer hardware match the human brain (1998), he estimated that human brains operate at about $10^{14}$ instructions per second, and that, if Moore's law continues, a computer with the same speed would cost only 1000 USD (1997 dollars) by the mid-2020s, thus "computers suitable for humanlike robots will appear in the 2020s".

=== Mind Children ===
In his 1988 book Mind Children, Moravec outlines Moore's law and predictions about the future of artificial life. Moravec outlines a timeline and a scenario in this regard, in that the robots will evolve into a new series of artificial species, starting around 2030–2040.

Moravec also outlined the "neural substitution argument" in Mind Children, published 7 years before David Chalmers published a similar argument in his paper "Absent Qualia, Fading Qualia, Dancing Qualia", which is sometimes cited as the source of the idea. The neural substitution argument is that if each neuron in a conscious brain can be replaced successively by an electronic substitute with the same behavior as the neuron it replaces, then a biological consciousness would be transferred seamlessly into an electronic computer, thus proving that consciousness does not depend on biology and can be treated as an abstract computable process.

=== Robot: Mere Machine to Transcendent Mind ===
In Robot: Mere Machine to Transcendent Mind, published in 1999, Moravec further considers the implications of evolving robot intelligence, generalizing Moore's law to technologies predating the integrated circuit, and extrapolating it to predict a coming "mind fire" of rapidly expanding superintelligence.

Arthur C. Clarke wrote about this book: "Robot is the most awesome work of controlled imagination I have ever encountered: Hans Moravec stretched my mind until it hit the stops." David Brin also praised the book: "Moravec blends hard scientific practicality with a prophet's far-seeing vision." On the other hand, the book was reviewed less favorably by Colin McGinn for The New York Times. McGinn wrote, "Moravec ... writes bizarre, confused, incomprehensible things about consciousness as an abstraction, like number, and as a mere "interpretation" of brain activity. He also loses his grip on the distinction between virtual and real reality as his speculations spiral majestically into incoherence."

== Publications ==
- Moravec, Hans (1988). Mind Children. Cambridge: Harvard University Press. ISBN 978-0-674-57618-6.
- Moravec, Hans P. (June 15, 1988). "Sensor Fusion in Certainty Grids for Mobile Robots". AI Magazine. 9 (2): 61. doi:10.1609/aimag.v9i2.676. ISSN 2371-9621.
- Moravec, Hans P. (1999). Robot: Mere Machine to Transcendent Mind. Oxford New York Paris: Oxford University Press. ISBN 0-19-513630-6.
- Moravec, Hans (1999). "Rise of the Robots". Scientific American. 281 (6). Scientific American, a division of Nature America, Inc.: 124–135. Bibcode:1999SciAm.281f.124M. doi:10.1038/scientificamerican1299-124. ISSN 0036-8733. JSTOR 26058531.
- Moravec, Hans (1998). "When will computer hardware match the human brain". Journal of Evolution and Technology. 1 (1).

== See also ==
- Artificial general intelligence
- Moravec's Paradox
- Mind uploading
- Simulated reality
- Space elevator
- Technological singularity
- Tether propulsion
- Time-loop logic
- Vision guidance
