= Solar sail =

Space propulsion method using Sun radiation

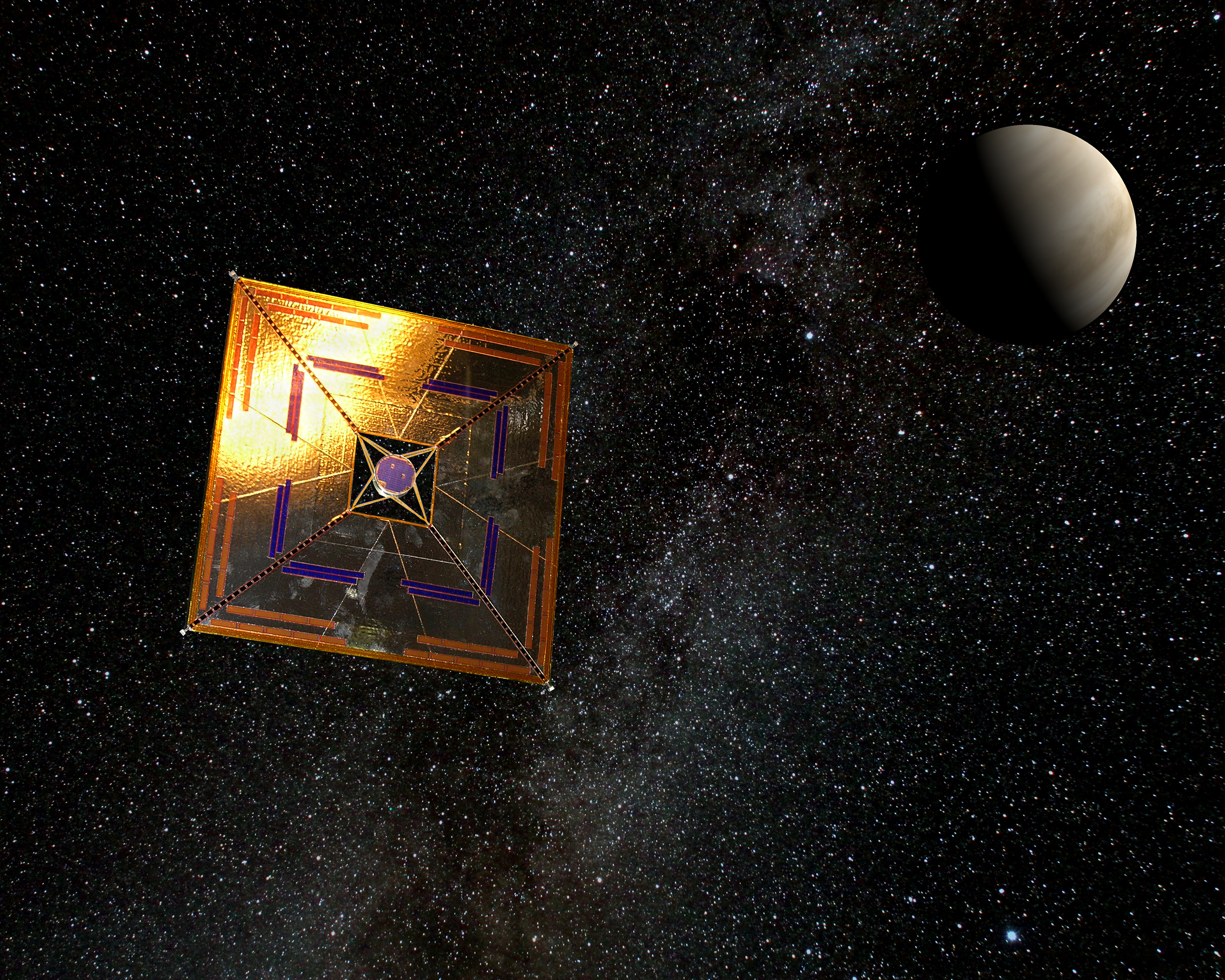
IKAROS, the first space-probe with a solar sail in flight (artist's depiction), featuring a typical square sail configuration of almost 200 m^{2}

Solar sails (also known as lightsails, light sails, and photon sails) are a method of spacecraft propulsion using radiation pressure exerted by sunlight on large surfaces. A number of spaceflight missions to test solar propulsion and navigation have been proposed since the 1980s. The two spacecraft to successfully use the technology for propulsion were IKAROS, launched in 2010, and LightSail-2, launched in 2019. A further demonstrator, Advanced Composite Solar Sail System (ACS3), was launched in 2024, and deployed successfully but is not being actively controlled due to a fault.

A useful analogy to solar sailing may be a sailing boat; the light exerting a force on the large surface is akin to a sail being blown by the wind. High-energy laser beams could be used as an alternative light source to exert much greater force than would be possible using sunlight, a concept known as beam sailing. Solar sail craft offer the possibility of low-cost operations combined with high speeds (relative to chemical rockets) and long operating lifetimes. Since they have few moving parts and use no propellant, they could potentially be used numerous times for the delivery of payloads.

Solar sails use a phenomenon that has a proven, measured effect on astrodynamics. Solar pressure affects all spacecraft, whether in interplanetary space or in orbit around a planet or small body. A typical spacecraft going to Mars, for example, will be displaced thousands of kilometers by solar pressure, so the effects must be accounted for in trajectory planning, which has been done since the time of the earliest interplanetary spacecraft of the 1960s. Solar pressure also affects the orientation of a spacecraft, a factor that must be included in spacecraft design.

The total force exerted on an 800 by 800 metres (2,600 by 2,600 ft) solar sail, for example, is about 5 N (1.1 lbf) at Earth's distance from the Sun,, and existing technology is limited to much smaller sizes (such as 9 by 9 metres (30 by 30 ft) for ACS 3, resulting in approximately 0.0007 N (0.00016 lbf)), making it a low-thrust propulsion system, similar to spacecraft propelled by electric engines. However, since it uses no propellant, that force can be exerted indefinitely (as long as the Sun or another star is sufficiently close) and the collective effect over time is great enough to be considered a potential manner of propelling spacecraft.

== History of concept ==
Johannes Kepler observed that comet tails point away from the Sun and suggested that the Sun caused the effect. In a letter to Galileo in 1610, he wrote, "Provide ships or sails adapted to the heavenly breezes, and there will be some who will brave even that void." He might have had the comet tail phenomenon in mind when he wrote those words, although his publications on comet tails came several years later.

The theory of electromagnetic fields and radiation, first published by James Clerk Maxwell in 1861–1864, shows that light has momentum and thus can exert pressure on objects. Maxwell's equations provide the theoretical foundation for sailing with light pressure. So by 1864, the physics community and beyond knew sunlight carried momentum that would exert a pressure on objects.

Jules Verne, in From the Earth to the Moon, published in 1865, wrote "there will some day appear velocities far greater than these [of the planets and the projectile], of which light or electricity will probably be the mechanical agent ... we shall one day travel to the moon, the planets, and the stars." This is possibly the first published recognition that light could move ships through space.

Pyotr Lebedev was first to successfully demonstrate light pressure, which he did in 1899 with a torsional balance; Ernest Nichols and Gordon Hull conducted a similar independent experiment in 1901 using a Nichols radiometer.

Svante Arrhenius predicted in 1908 the possibility of solar radiation pressure distributing life spores across interstellar distances, providing one means to explain the concept of panspermia. He was apparently the first scientist to state that light could move objects between stars.

Konstantin Tsiolkovsky first proposed using the pressure of sunlight to propel spacecraft through space in 1921 and suggested "using tremendous mirrors of very thin sheets to utilize the pressure of sunlight to attain cosmic velocities".

Friedrich Zander (Tsander) published a technical paper in 1925 that included technical analysis of solar sailing. Zander wrote of "applying small forces" using "light pressure or transmission of light energy to distances by means of very thin mirrors".

JBS Haldane speculated in 1927 about the invention of tubular spaceships that would take humanity to space and how "wings of metallic foil of a square kilometre or more in area are spread out to catch the Sun's radiation pressure".

J. D. Bernal wrote in 1929, "A form of space sailing might be developed which used the repulsive effect of the Sun's rays instead of wind. A space vessel spreading its large, metallic wings, acres in extent, to the full, might be blown to the limit of Neptune's orbit. Then, to increase its speed, it would tack, close-hauled, down the gravitational field, spreading full sail again as it rushed past the Sun."

Science fiction authors used the solar sail in their writing, such as Russell Saunders's 1951 article Clipper Ships of Space in Astounding Science Fiction, and the short story Sunjammer by Arthur C. Clarke, originally published in the March 1964 issue of Boys' Life depicting a yacht race between solar sail spacecraft.

Carl Sagan, in the 1970s, popularized the idea of sailing on light using a giant structure which would reflect photons in one direction, creating momentum. He brought up his ideas in college lectures, books, and television shows. He was fixated on quickly launching this spacecraft in time to perform a rendezvous with Halley's Comet. Unfortunately, the mission didn't take place in time and he would never live to finally see it through.

The first formal technology and design effort for a solar sail began in 1976 at Jet Propulsion Laboratory for a proposed mission to rendezvous with Halley's Comet.

== Types ==
=== Reflective ===
Most solar sails are based on reflection. The surface of the sail is highly reflective, like a mirror, and light reflecting off of the surface imparts a force. A key limitation, which in practice affects the efficiency of the trajectories flown by the sail, is that the direction and magnitude of the thrust are coupled, hence cannot be controlled independently.

=== Diffractive ===
In 2018, diffraction was proposed as a different solar sail propulsion mechanism. A material with an adjustable diffractive grating would be used to direct incoming light at a desired angle. This arrangement would remove the coupling of direction and magnitude of the thrust, and allow this thrust to be adjusted more rapidly than with a reflective sail (which needs to be tilted to different angles to achieve control). However, the technology readiness level of the sail material is not as mature as in the case of reflective sails.

=== Solar photon thruster ===
The coupling of direction and thrust seen in a reflective solar sail has also been proposed to be addressed with a solar photon thruster. This also uses a reflective membrane, but unlike a conventional solar sail, the membrane directs the incoming radiation onto a small collimating mirror. The collimating mirror directs this radiation onto a reflecting mirror, the orientation of which affects the direction of the outgoing beam of radiation and hence the direction of the thrust. Thus, the thrust direction is controlled not by turning the whole reflector, but by turning a small mirror on which this radiation has been focused. Whilst this does not fully remove the coupling of the magnitude and direction of the thrust, it means that thrust is proportional to the cosine, rather than the cosine squared of its direction, an alteration which increases the magnitude of the thrust available at all angles.

== Alternatives ==
=== Electric solar wind ===
Pekka Janhunen from FMI has proposed a type of solar sail called the electric solar wind sail. Mechanically it has little in common with the traditional solar sail design. The sails are replaced with straightened conducting tethers (wires) placed radially around the host ship. The wires are electrically charged to create an electric field around the wires. The electric field extends a few tens of metres into the plasma of the surrounding solar wind. The solar protons are reflected by the electric field (like the photons on a traditional solar sail). The radius of the sail is from the electric field rather than the actual wire itself, making the sail lighter. The craft can also be steered by regulating the electric charge of the wires. A practical electric sail would have 50–100 straightened wires with a length of about 20 km each.

Electric solar wind sails can adjust their electrostatic fields and sail attitudes.

=== Magnetic ===
A magnetic sail would also employ the solar wind. However, the magnetic field deflects the electrically charged particles in the wind. It uses wire loops, and runs a static current through them instead of applying a static voltage.

All these designs maneuver, though the mechanisms are different.

Magnetic sails bend the path of the charged protons that are in the solar wind. By changing the sails' attitudes, and the size of the magnetic fields, they can change the amount and direction of the thrust.

== Physical principles for reflective sails ==
=== Solar radiation pressure ===
The force imparted to a solar sail arises from the momentum of photons. The momentum of a photon or an entire flux is given by Einstein's relation:

$$p = E/c$$

where p is the momentum, E is the energy (of the photon or flux), and c is the speed of light. Specifically, the momentum of a photon depends on its wavelength p = h/λ

Solar radiation pressure can be related to the irradiance (solar constant) value of 1361 W/m^{2} at 1 AU (Earth-Sun distance), as revised in 2011:

- perfect absorbance: F = 4.54 μN per square metre (4.54 μPa) in the direction of the incident beam (a perfectly inelastic collision)
- perfect reflectance: F = 9.08 μN per square metre (9.08 μPa) in the direction normal to surface (an elastic collision)

An ideal sail is flat and has 100% specular reflection. An actual sail will have an overall efficiency of about 90%, about 8.17 μN/m^{2}, due to curvature (billow), wrinkles, absorbance, re-radiation from front and back, non-specular effects, and other factors.

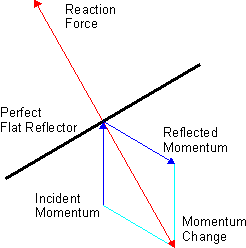
Force on a sail results from reflecting the photon flux

The force on a sail and the actual acceleration of the craft vary by the inverse square of distance from the Sun (unless extremely close to the Sun), and by the square of the cosine of the angle between the sail force vector and the radial from the Sun, so

$F = F_0 \cos^2(\theta) / R^2$ (for an ideal sail)

where R is distance from the Sun in AU. An actual square sail can be modelled as:

$$F = F_0 (0.349 + 0.662 \cos( 2\theta) - 0.011 \cos( 4\theta)) / R^2$$

Note that the force and acceleration approach zero generally around θ = 60° rather than 90° as one might expect with an ideal sail.

If some of the energy is absorbed, the absorbed energy will heat the sail, which re-radiates that energy from the front and rear surfaces, depending on the emissivity of those two surfaces.

Solar wind, the flux of charged particles blown out from the Sun, exerts a nominal dynamic pressure of about 3 to 4 nPa, three orders of magnitude less than solar radiation pressure on a reflective sail.

=== Sail parameters ===
Sail loading (areal density) is an important parameter, which is the total mass divided by the sail area, expressed in g/m^{2}. It is represented by the Greek letter σ (sigma).

A sail craft has a characteristic acceleration, a_{c}, which it would experience at 1 AU when facing the Sun. Note this value accounts for both the incident and reflected momentums. Using the value from above of 9.08 μN per square metre of radiation pressure at 1 AU, a_{c} is related to areal density by:

a_{c} = 9.08(efficiency) / σ mm/s^{2}

Assuming 90% efficiency, a_{c} = 8.17 / σ mm/s^{2}

The lightness number, λ, or often β, is the dimensionless ratio of maximum vehicle acceleration divided by the Sun's local gravity. Using the values at 1 AU:

λ = a_{c} / 5.93

The lightness number is also independent of distance from the Sun because both gravity and light pressure fall off as the inverse square of the distance from the Sun. Therefore, this number defines the types of orbit maneuvers that are possible for a given vessel.

The table presents some example values. Payloads are not included. The first two are from the detailed design effort at JPL in the 1970s. The third, the lattice sailer, might represent about the best possible performance level. The dimensions for square and lattice sails are edges. The dimension for heliogyro is blade tip to blade tip.

Type	σ (g/m^{2})	a_{c} (mm/s^{2})	λ	Size (km^{2})
Square sail	5.27	1.56	0.26	0.820
Heliogyro	6.39	1.29	0.22	15
Lattice sailer	0.07	117	20	0.840

=== Attitude control ===
An active attitude control system (ACS) is essential for a sail craft to achieve and maintain a desired orientation. The required sail orientation changes slowly (often less than 1 degree per day) in interplanetary space, but much more rapidly in a planetary orbit. The ACS must be capable of meeting these orientation requirements. Attitude control is achieved by a relative shift between the craft's center of pressure and its center of mass. This can be achieved with control vanes, movement of individual sails, movement of a control mass, or altering reflectivity.

Holding a constant attitude requires that the ACS maintain a net torque of zero on the craft. The total force and torque on a sail, or set of sails, is not constant along a trajectory. The force changes with solar distance and sail angle, which changes the billow in the sail and deflects some elements of the supporting structure, resulting in changes in the sail force and torque.

Sail temperature also changes with solar distance and sail angle, which changes sail dimensions. The radiant heat from the sail changes the temperature of the supporting structure. Both factors affect total force and torque.

To hold the desired attitude the ACS must compensate for all of these changes.

== Applications ==
Potential applications for sail craft range throughout the Solar System, from near the Sun to the comet clouds beyond Neptune. The craft can make outbound voyages to deliver loads or to take up station keeping at the destination. They can be used to haul cargo and possibly also used for human travel.

=== Inner planets ===
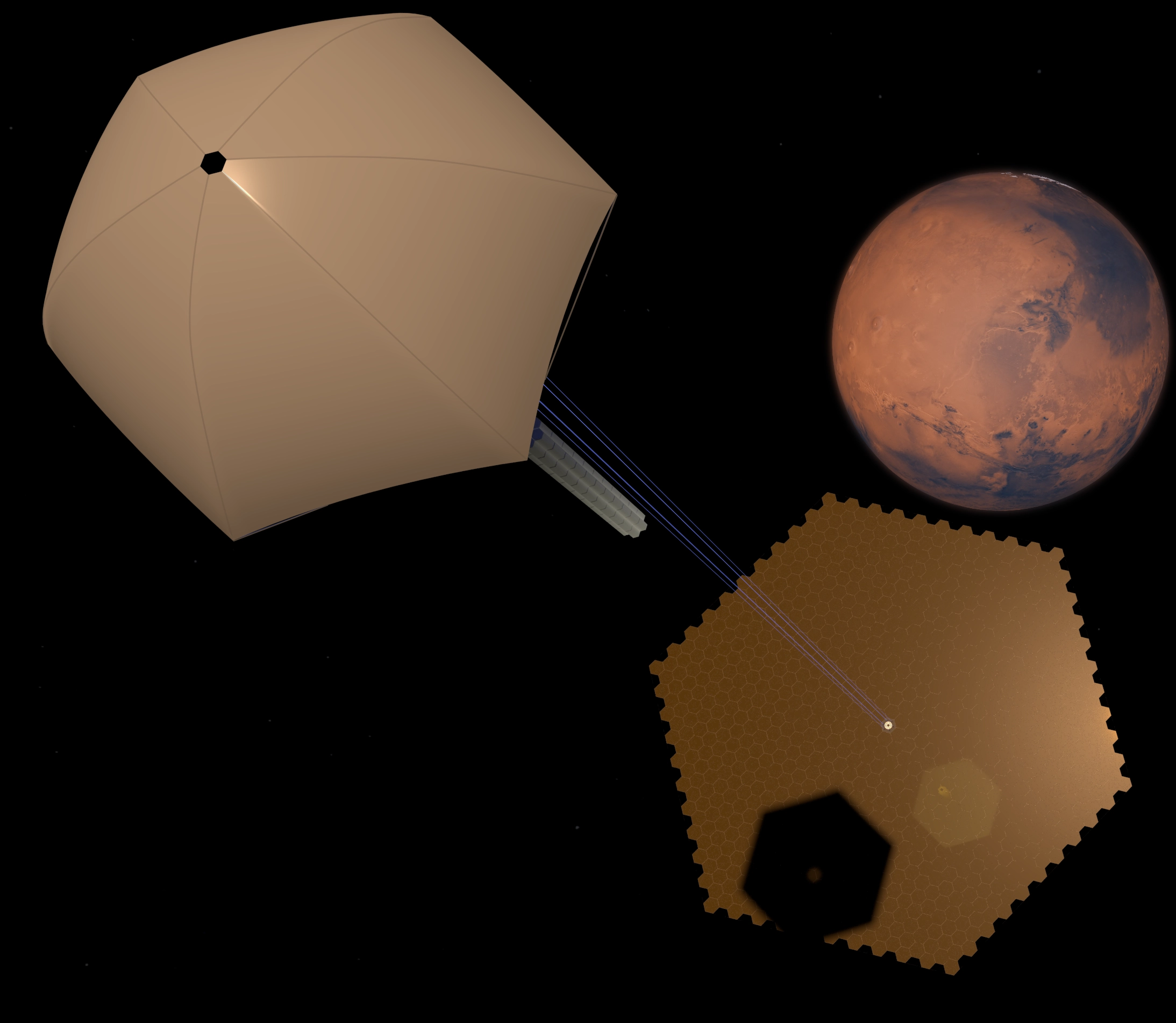
Solar sail being propelled from a space-based solar array

For trips within the inner Solar System, they can deliver payloads and then return to Earth for subsequent voyages, operating as an interplanetary shuttle. For Mars in particular, the craft could provide economical means of routinely supplying operations on the planet. According to Jerome Wright, "The cost of launching the necessary conventional propellants from Earth are enormous for manned missions. Use of sailing ships could potentially save more than $10 billion in mission costs."

Solar sail craft can approach the Sun to deliver observation payloads or to take up station keeping orbits. They can operate at 0.25 AU or closer. They can reach high orbital inclinations, including polar.

Solar sails can travel to and from all of the inner planets. Trips to Mercury and Venus are for rendezvous and orbit entry for the payload. Trips to Mars could be either for rendezvous or swing-by with release of the payload for aerodynamic braking.

Sail size m	Mercury Rendezvous		Venus Rendezvous		Mars Rendezvous		Mars Aerobrake	
Sail size m	days	tons	days	tons	days	tons	days	tons
800 σ = 5 g/m^{2} w/o cargo	600	9	200	1	400	2	131	2
800 σ = 5 g/m^{2} w/o cargo	900	19	270	5	500	5	200	5
800 σ = 5 g/m^{2} w/o cargo	1200	28			700	9	338	10
2000 σ = 3 g/m^{2} w/o cargo	600	66	200	17	400	23	131	20
2000 σ = 3 g/m^{2} w/o cargo	900	124	270	36	500	40	200	40
2000 σ = 3 g/m^{2} w/o cargo	1200	184			700	66	338	70

=== Outer planets ===
Minimum transfer times to the outer planets benefit from using an indirect transfer (solar swing-by). However, this method results in high arrival speeds. Slower transfers have lower arrival speeds.

The minimum transfer time to Jupiter for a_{c} of 1 mm/s^{2} with no departure velocity relative to Earth is 2 years when using an indirect transfer (solar swing-by). The arrival speed (V_{∞}) is close to 17 km/s. For Saturn, the minimum trip time is 3.3 years, with an arrival speed of nearly 19 km/s.

Minimum times to the outer planets (a_{c} = 1 mm/s^{2})
	Jupiter	Saturn	Uranus	Neptune
Time, yr	2.0	3.3	5.8	8.5
Speed, km/s	17	19	20	20

=== Oort Cloud/Sun's inner gravity focus ===
The Sun's inner gravitational focus point lies at minimum distance of 550 AU from the Sun, and is the point to which light from distant objects is focused by gravity as a result of it passing by the Sun. This is thus the distant point to which solar gravity will cause the region of deep space on the other side of the Sun to be focused, thus serving effectively as a very large telescope objective lens.

It has been proposed that an inflated sail, made of beryllium, that starts at 0.05 AU from the Sun would gain an initial acceleration of 36.4 m/s^{2}, and reach a speed of 0.00264c (about 950 km/s) in less than a day. Such proximity to the Sun could prove to be impractical in the near term due to the structural degradation of beryllium at high temperatures, diffusion of hydrogen at high temperatures as well as an electrostatic gradient, generated by the ionization of beryllium from the solar wind, posing a burst risk. A revised perihelion of 0.1 AU would reduce the aforementioned temperature and solar flux exposure. Such a sail would take "Two and a half years to reach the heliopause, six and a half years to reach the Sun’s inner gravitational focus, with arrival at the inner Oort Cloud in no more than thirty years." "Such a mission could perform useful astrophysical observations en route, explore gravitational focusing techniques, and image Oort Cloud objects while exploring particles and fields in that region that are of galactic rather than solar origin."

=== Satellites ===
Robert L. Forward has commented that a solar sail could be used to modify the orbit of a satellite about the Earth. In the limit, a sail could be used to "hover" a satellite above one pole of the Earth. Spacecraft fitted with solar sails could also be placed in close orbits such that they are stationary with respect to either the Sun or the Earth, a type of satellite named by Forward a "statite". This is possible because the propulsion provided by the sail offsets the gravitational attraction of the Sun. Such an orbit could be useful for studying the properties of the Sun for long durations. Likewise a solar sail-equipped spacecraft could also remain on station nearly above the polar solar terminator of a planet such as the Earth by tilting the sail at the appropriate angle needed to counteract the planet's gravity.

In his book The Case for Mars, Robert Zubrin points out that the reflected sunlight from a large statite, placed near the polar terminator of the planet Mars, could be focused on one of the Martian polar ice caps to significantly warm the planet's atmosphere. Such a statite could be made from asteroid material.

A group of satellites designed to act as sails has been proposed to measure Earth's energy imbalance which is the most fundamental measure of the planet's rate of global warming. On-board state-of-the-art accelerometers would measure shifts in the pressure differential between incoming solar and outgoing thermal radiation on opposing sides of each satellite. Measurement accuracy has been projected to be better than that achievable with compact radiometric detectors.

=== Trajectory corrections ===
The MESSENGER probe orbiting Mercury used light pressure on its solar panels to perform fine trajectory corrections on the way to Mercury. By changing the angle of the solar panels relative to the Sun, the amount of solar radiation pressure was varied to adjust the spacecraft trajectory more delicately than possible with thrusters. Minor errors are greatly amplified by gravity assist maneuvers, so using radiation pressure to make very small corrections saved large amounts of propellant.

=== Interstellar flight ===
In the 1970s, Robert Forward proposed two beam-powered propulsion schemes using either lasers or masers to push giant sails to a significant fraction of the speed of light.

In the science fiction novel Rocheworld, Forward described a light sail propelled by super lasers. As the starship neared its destination, the outer portion of the sail would detach. The outer sail would then refocus and reflect the lasers back onto a smaller, inner sail. This would provide braking thrust to stop the ship in the destination star system.

Both methods pose monumental engineering challenges. The lasers would have to operate for years continuously at gigawatt strength. Forward's solution to this requires enormous solar panel arrays to be built at or near the planet Mercury. A planet-sized mirror or Fresnel lens would need to be located at several dozen astronomical units from the Sun to keep the lasers focused on the sail. The giant braking sail would have to act as a precision mirror to focus the braking beam onto the inner "deceleration" sail.

A potentially easier approach would be to use a maser to drive a "solar sail" composed of a mesh of wires with the same spacing as the wavelength of the microwaves directed at the sail, since the manipulation of microwave radiation is somewhat easier than the manipulation of visible light. The hypothetical "Starwisp" interstellar probe design would use microwaves, rather than visible light, to push it. Masers spread out more rapidly than optical lasers owing to their longer wavelength, and so would not have as great an effective range.

Masers could also be used to power a painted solar sail, a conventional sail coated with a layer of chemicals designed to evaporate when struck by microwave radiation. The momentum generated by this evaporation could significantly increase the thrust generated by solar sails, as a form of lightweight ablative laser propulsion.

To further focus the energy on a distant solar sail, Forward proposed a lens designed as a large zone plate. This would be placed at a location between the laser or maser and the spacecraft.

Another more physically realistic approach would be to use the light from the Sun to accelerate the spacecraft. The ship would first drop into an orbit making a close pass to the Sun, to maximize the solar energy input on the sail, then it would begin to accelerate away from the system using the light from the Sun. Acceleration will drop approximately as the inverse square of the distance from the Sun, and beyond some distance, the ship would no longer receive enough light to accelerate it significantly, but would maintain the final velocity attained. When nearing the target star, the ship could turn its sails toward it and begin to use the outward pressure of the destination star to decelerate. Rockets could augment the solar thrust.

Similar solar sailing launch and capture were suggested for directed panspermia to expand life in other solar systems. Velocities of 0.05% the speed of light could be obtained by solar sails carrying 10 kg payloads, using thin solar sail vehicles with effective areal densities of 0.1 g/m^{2} with thin sails of 0.1 μm thickness and sizes on the order of one square kilometer. Alternatively, swarms of 1 mm capsules could be launched on solar sails with radii of 42 cm, each carrying 10,000 capsules of a hundred million extremophile microorganisms to seed life in diverse target environments.

Theoretical studies suggest relativistic speeds if the solar sail harnesses a supernova.

=== Deorbiting artificial satellites ===
Small solar sails have been proposed to accelerate the deorbiting of small artificial satellites from Earth orbits. Satellites in low Earth orbit can use a combination of solar pressure on the sail and increased atmospheric drag to accelerate satellite reentry. A de-orbit sail developed at Cranfield University is part of the UK satellite TechDemoSat-1, launched in 2014. The sail deployed at the end of the satellite's five-year useful life in May 2019. The sail's purpose is to bring the satellite out of orbit over a period of about 25 years. In July 2015 British 3U CubeSat called DeorbitSail was launched into space with the purpose of testing 16 m^{2} deorbit structure, but eventually it failed to deploy it. A student 2U CubeSat mission called PW-Sat2, launched in December 2018 and tested a 4 m^{2} deorbit sail. It successfully deorbited in February 2021. In June 2017, a second British 3U CubeSat called InflateSail deployed a 10 m^{2} deorbit sail at an altitude of 500 kilometers (310 mi). In June 2017 the 3U Cubesat URSAMAIOR has been launched in low Earth orbit to test the deorbiting system ARTICA developed by Spacemind. The device, which occupies only 0.4 U of the cubesat, shall deploy a sail of 2.1 m^{2} to deorbit the satellite at the end of the operational life.

== Sail configurations ==
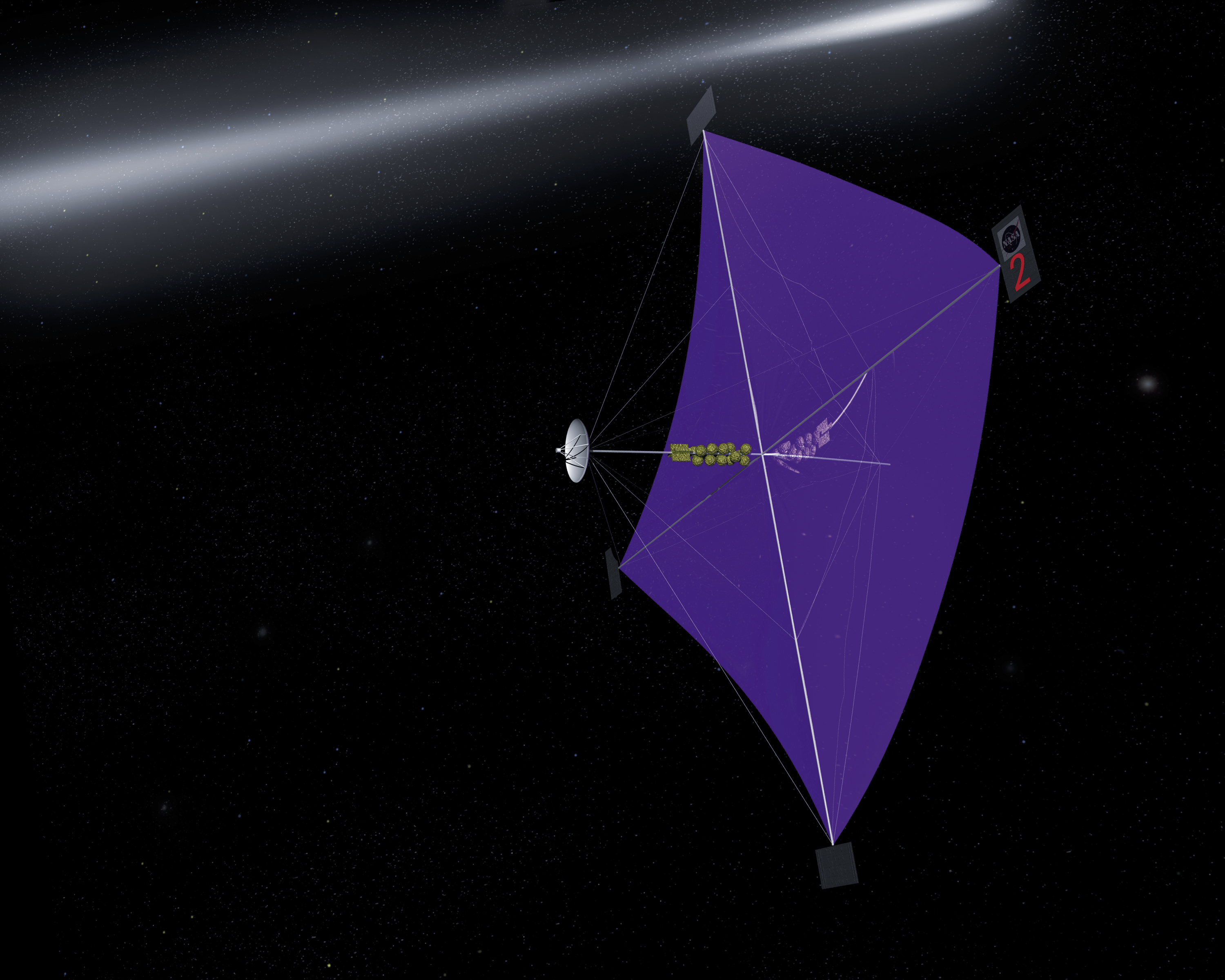
A NASA illustration of the unlit side of a half-kilometre solar sail, showing the struts stretching the sail

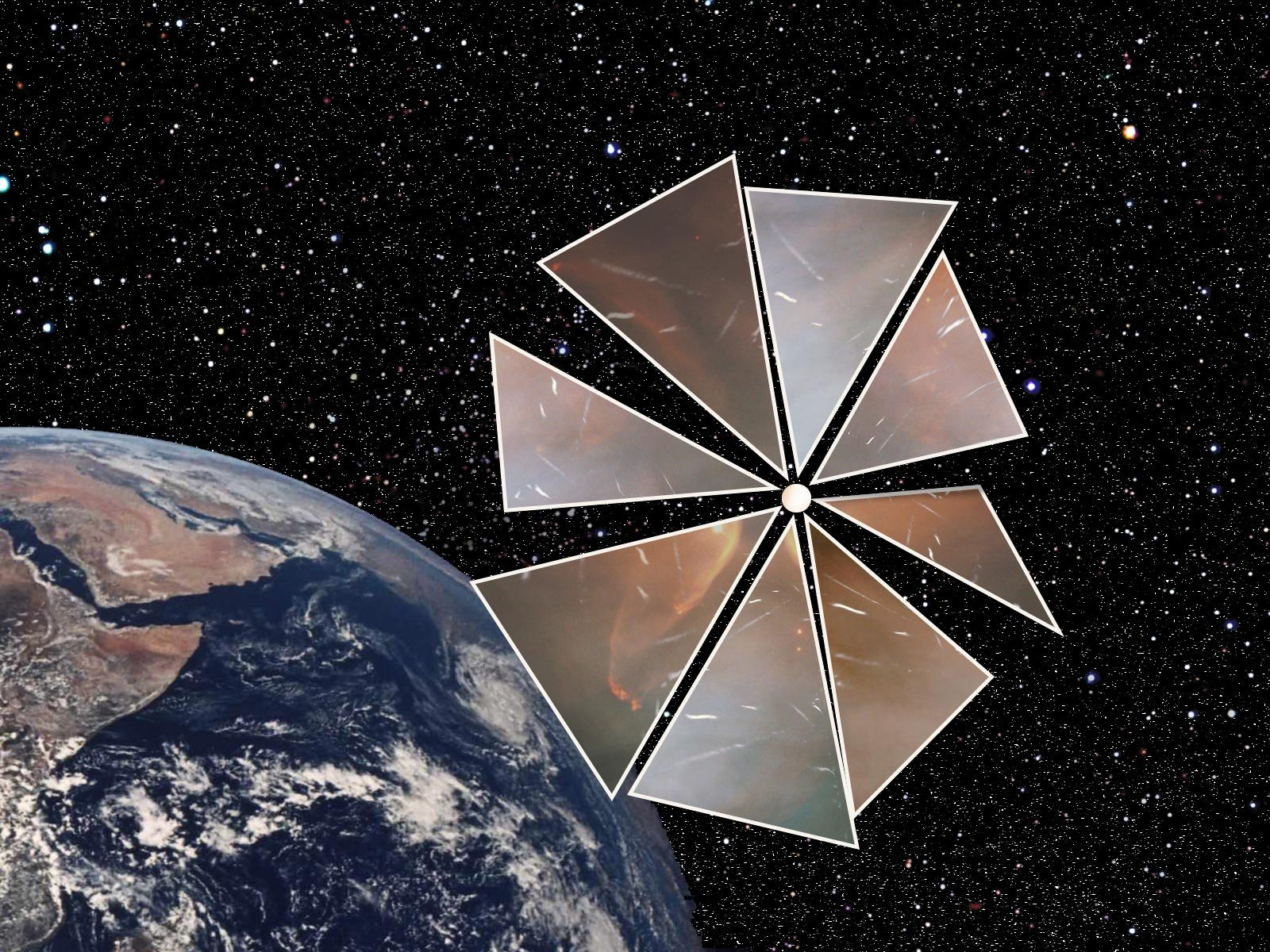
An artist's depiction of a Cosmos 1-type spaceship in orbit

IKAROS, launched in 2010, was the first practical solar sail vehicle. As of 2015, it was still under thrust, proving the practicality of a solar sail for long-duration missions. It is spin-deployed, with tip-masses in the corners of its square sail. The sail is made of thin polyimide film, coated with evaporated aluminium. It steers with electrically controlled liquid crystal panels. The sail slowly spins, and these panels turn on and off to control the attitude of the vehicle. When on, they diffuse light, reducing the momentum transfer to that part of the sail. When off, the sail reflects more light, transferring more momentum. In that way, they turn the sail. Thin-film solar cells are also integrated into the sail, powering the spacecraft. The design is very reliable, because spin deployment, which is preferable for large sails, simplified the mechanisms to unfold the sail and the LCD panels have no moving parts.

Parachutes have very low mass, but a parachute is not a workable configuration for a solar sail. Analysis shows that a parachute configuration would collapse from the forces exerted by shroud lines, since radiation pressure does not behave like aerodynamic pressure, and would not act to keep the parachute open.

The highest thrust-to-mass designs for ground-assembled deploy-able structures are square sails with the masts and guy lines on the dark side of the sail. Usually there are four masts that spread the corners of the sail, and a mast in the center to hold guy-wires. One of the largest advantages is that there are no hot spots in the rigging from wrinkling or bagging, and the sail protects the structure from the Sun. This form can, therefore, go close to the Sun for maximum thrust. Most designs steer with small moving sails on the ends of the spars.

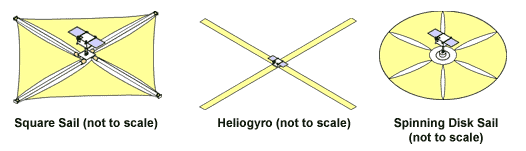

In the 1970s JPL studied many rotating blade and ring sails for a mission to rendezvous with Halley's Comet. The intention was to stiffen the structures using angular momentum, eliminating the need for struts, and saving mass. In all cases, surprisingly large amounts of tensile strength were needed to cope with dynamic loads. Weaker sails would ripple or oscillate when the sail's attitude changed, and the oscillations would add and cause structural failure. The difference in the thrust-to-mass ratio between practical designs was almost nil, and the static designs were easier to control.

JPL's reference design was called the "heliogyro". It had plastic-film blades deployed from rollers and held out by centrifugal forces as it rotated. The spacecraft's attitude and direction were to be completely controlled by changing the angle of the blades in various ways, similar to the cyclic and collective pitch of a helicopter. Although the design had no mass advantage over a square sail, it remained attractive because the method of deploying the sail was simpler than a strut-based design. The CubeSail (UltraSail) is an active project aiming to deploy a heliogyro sail.

Heliogyro design is similar to the blades on a helicopter. The design is faster to manufacture due to lightweight centrifugal stiffening of sails. Also, they are highly efficient in cost and velocity because the blades are lightweight and long. Unlike the square and spinning disk designs, heliogyro is easier to deploy because the blades are compacted on a reel. The blades roll out when they are deploying after the ejection from the spacecraft. As the heliogyro travels through space the system spins around because of the centrifugal acceleration. Finally, payloads for the space flights are placed in the center of gravity to even out the distribution of weight to ensure stable flight.

JPL also investigated "ring sails" (Spinning Disk Sail in the above diagram), panels attached to the edge of a rotating spacecraft. The panels would have slight gaps, about one to five percent of the total area. Lines would connect the edge of one sail to the other. Masses in the middles of these lines would pull the sails taut against the coning caused by the radiation pressure. JPL researchers said that this might be an attractive sail design for large crewed structures. The inner ring, in particular, might be made to have artificial gravity roughly equal to the gravity on the surface of Mars.

A solar sail can serve a dual function as a high-gain antenna. Designs differ, but most modify the metalization pattern to create a holographic monochromatic lens or mirror in the radio frequencies of interest, including visible light.

== Reflective sail making ==
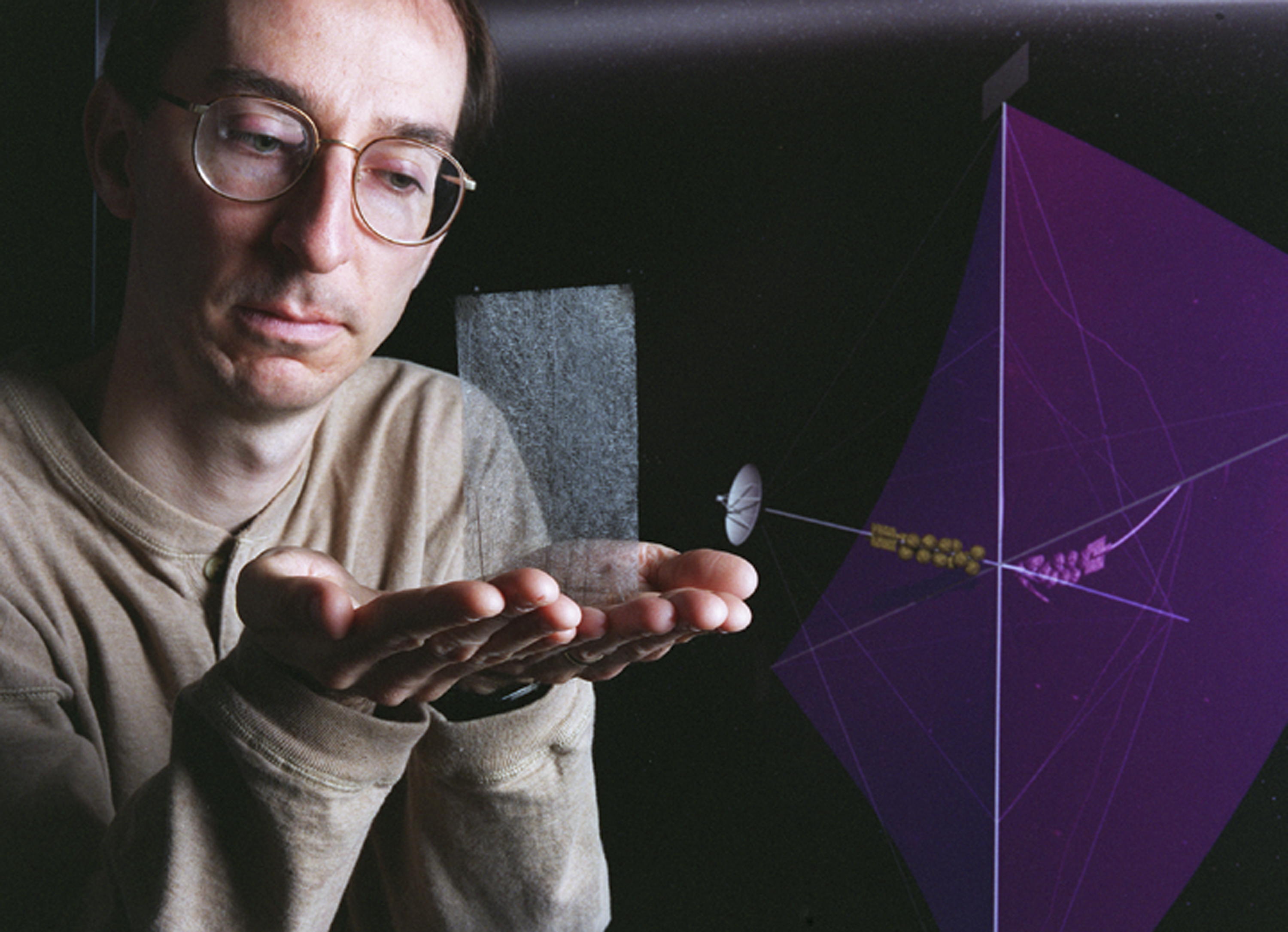
Proposed material for the construction of solar sails - carbon fiber.

=== Materials ===
The most common material in current designs is a thin layer of aluminum coating on a polymer (plastic) sheet, such as aluminized 2 μm Kapton film. The polymer provides mechanical support as well as flexibility, while the thin metal layer provides the reflectivity. Such material resists the heat of a pass close to the Sun and still remains reasonably strong. The aluminum reflecting film is on the Sun side. The sails of Cosmos 1 were made of aluminized PET film (Mylar).

Eric Drexler developed a concept for a sail in which the polymer was removed. He proposed very high thrust-to-mass solar sails, and made prototypes of the sail material. His sail would use panels of thin aluminium film (30 to 100 nanometres thick) supported by a tensile structure. The sail would rotate and would have to be continually under thrust. He made and handled samples of the film in the laboratory, but the material was too delicate to survive folding, launch, and deployment. The design planned to rely on space-based production of the film panels, joining them to a deployable tension structure. Sails in this class would offer high area per unit mass and hence accelerations up to "fifty times higher" than designs based on deploy-able plastic films. The material developed for the Drexler solar sail was a thin aluminium film with a baseline thickness of 0.1 μm, to be fabricated by vapor deposition in a space-based system. Drexler used a similar process to prepare films on the ground. As anticipated, these films demonstrated adequate strength and robustness for handling in the laboratory and for use in space, but not for folding, launch, and deployment.

Research by Geoffrey Landis in 1998–1999, funded by the NASA Institute for Advanced Concepts, showed that various materials such as alumina for laser lightsails and carbon fiber for microwave pushed lightsails were superior sail materials to the previously standard aluminium or Kapton films.

In 2000, Energy Science Laboratories developed a new carbon fiber material that might be useful for solar sails. The material is over 200 times thicker than conventional solar sail designs, but it is so porous that it has the same mass. The rigidity and durability of this material could make solar sails that are significantly sturdier than plastic films. The material could self-deploy and should withstand higher temperatures.

There has been some theoretical speculation about using molecular manufacturing techniques to create advanced, strong, hyper-light sail material, based on nanotube mesh weaves, where the weave "spaces" are less than half the wavelength of light impinging on the sail. While such materials have so far only been produced in laboratory conditions, and the means for manufacturing such material on an industrial scale are not yet available, such materials could mass less than 0.1 g/m^{2}, making them lighter than any current sail material by a factor of at least 30. For comparison, 5 micrometre thick Mylar sail material mass 7 g/m^{2}, aluminized Kapton films have a mass as much as 12 g/m^{2}, and Energy Science Laboratories' new carbon fiber material masses 3 g/m^{2}.

The least dense metal is lithium, about 5 times less dense than aluminium. Fresh, unoxidized surfaces are reflective. At a thickness of 20 nm, lithium has an area density of 0.011 g/m^{2}. A high-performance sail could be made of lithium alone at 20 nm (no emission layer). It would have to be fabricated in space and not used to approach the Sun. In the limit, a sail craft might be constructed with a total areal density of around 0.02 g/m^{2}, giving it a lightness number of 67 and a_{c} of about 400 mm/s^{2}. Magnesium and beryllium are also potential materials for high-performance sails. These 3 metals can be alloyed with each other and with aluminium.

=== Reflection and emissivity layers ===
Aluminium is the common choice for the reflection layer. It typically has a thickness of at least 20 nm, with a reflectivity of 0.88 to 0.90. Chromium is a good choice for the emission layer on the face away from the Sun. It can readily provide emissivity values of 0.63 to 0.73 for thicknesses from 5 to 20 nm on plastic film. Usable emissivity values are empirical because thin-film effects dominate; bulk emissivity values do not hold up in these cases because material thickness is much thinner than the emitted wavelengths.

=== Fabrication ===
Sails are fabricated on Earth on long tables where ribbons are unrolled and joined to create the sails. Sail material needed to have as little weight as possible because it would require the use of the shuttle to carry the craft into orbit. Thus, these sails are packed, launched, and unfurled in space.

In the future, fabrication could take place in orbit inside large frames that support the sail. This would result in lower mass sails and elimination of the risk of deployment failure.

== Operations ==
Rendering of the deployment of a solar sail, the solar sail of the Advanced Composite Solar Sail System (ACS3)

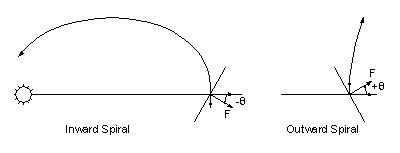
A solar sail can spiral inward or outward by setting the sail angle

=== Changing orbits ===
Sailing operations are simplest in interplanetary orbits, where altitude changes are done at low rates. For outward bound trajectories, the sail force vector is oriented forward of the Sun line, which increases orbital energy and angular momentum, resulting in the craft moving farther from the Sun. For inward trajectories, the sail force vector is oriented behind the Sun line, which decreases orbital energy and angular momentum, resulting in the craft moving in toward the Sun. It is worth noting that only the Sun's gravity pulls the craft toward the Sun—there is no analog to a sailboat's tacking to windward. To change orbital inclination, the force vector is turned out of the plane of the velocity vector.

In orbits around planets or other bodies, the sail is oriented so that its force vector has a component along the velocity vector, either in the direction of motion for an outward spiral, or against the direction of motion for an inward spiral.

Trajectory optimizations can often require intervals of reduced or zero thrust. This can be achieved by rolling the craft around the Sun line with the sail set at an appropriate angle to reduce or remove the thrust.

=== Swing-by maneuvers ===
A close solar passage can be used to increase a craft's energy. The increased radiation pressure combines with the efficacy of being deep in the Sun's gravity well to substantially increase the energy for runs to the outer Solar System. The optimal approach to the Sun is done by increasing the orbital eccentricity while keeping the energy level as high as practical. The minimum approach distance is a function of sail angle, thermal properties of the sail and other structure, load effects on structure, and sail optical characteristics (reflectivity and emissivity). A close passage can result in substantial optical degradation. Required turn rates can increase substantially for a close passage. A sail craft arriving at a star can use a close passage to reduce energy, which also applies to a sail craft on a return trip from the outer Solar System.

A lunar swing-by can have important benefits for trajectories leaving from or arriving at Earth. This can reduce trip times, especially in cases where the sail is heavily loaded. A swing-by can also be used to obtain favorable departure or arrival directions relative to Earth.

A planetary swing-by could also be employed similar to what is done with coasting spacecraft, but good alignments might not exist due to the requirements for overall optimization of the trajectory.

=== Laser powered ===
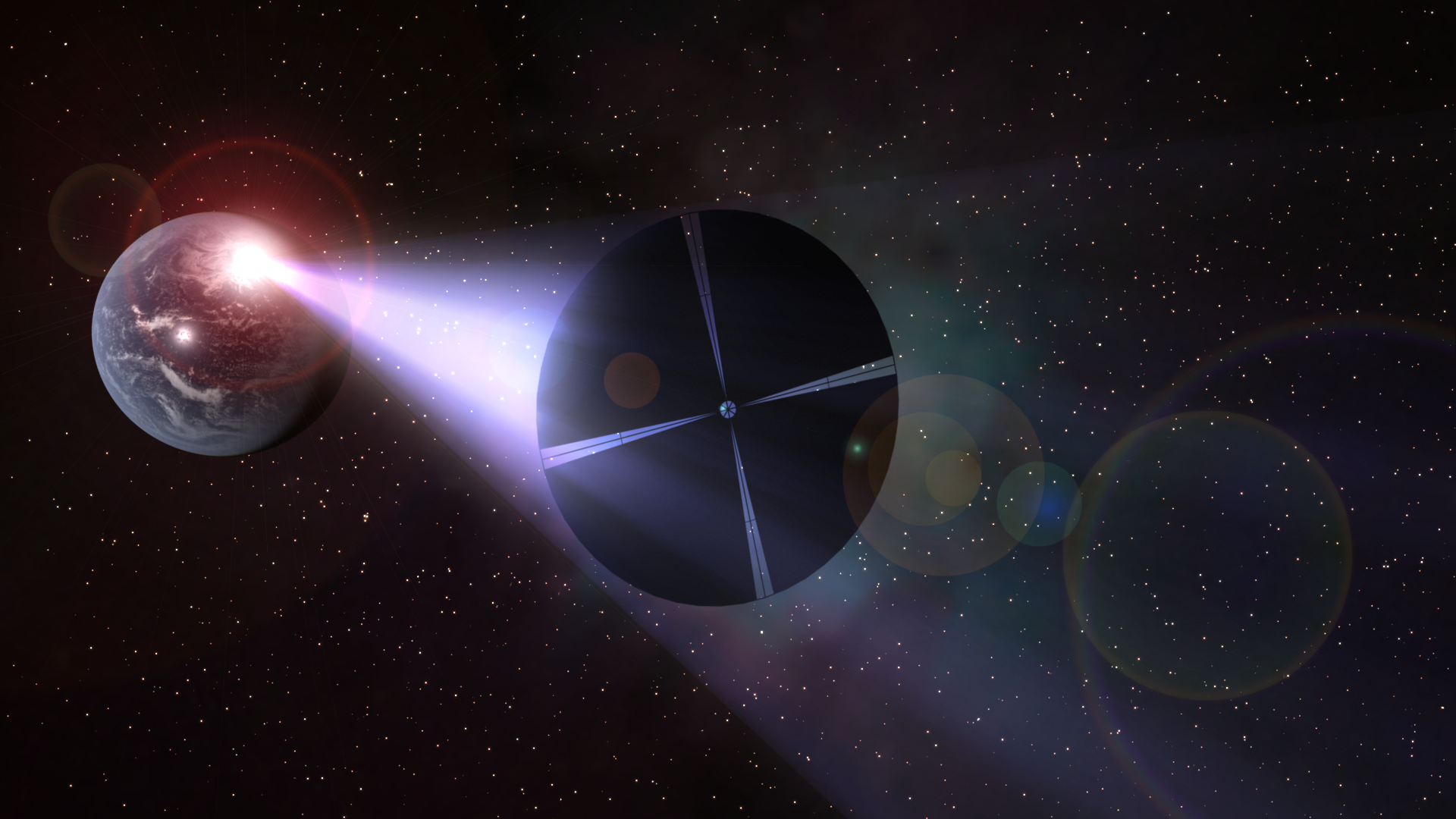
Artist rendering of a light sail propelled by an Earth based laser

The following table lists some example concepts using beamed laser propulsion as proposed by the physicist Robert L. Forward:

Mission	Laser power	Vehicle mass	Acceleration	Sail diameter	Maximum velocity (% of the speed of light)
1. Flyby – Alpha Centauri, 40 years
outbound stage	65 GW	1 t	0.036 g	3.6 km	11% @ 0.17 ly
2. Rendezvous – Alpha Centauri, 41 years
outbound stage	7,200 GW	785 t	0.005 g	100 km	21% @ 4.29 ly
deceleration stage	26,000 GW	71 t	0.2 g	30 km	21% @ 4.29 ly
3. Crewed – Epsilon Eridani, 51 years (including 5 years exploring star system)
outbound stage	75,000,000 GW	78,500 t	0.3 g	1000 km	50% @ 0.4 ly
deceleration stage	21,500,000 GW	7,850 t	0.3 g	320 km	50% @ 10.4 ly
return stage	710,000 GW	785 t	0.3 g	100 km	50% @ 10.4 ly
deceleration stage	60,000 GW	785 t	0.3 g	100 km	50% @ 0.4 ly

==== Interstellar travel catalog to use photogravitational assists for a full stop ====
Name	Travel time (yr)	Distance (ly)	Luminosity (L_{☉})
Sirius A	68.90	8.58	24.20
α Centauri A	101.25	4.36	1.52
α Centauri B	147.58	4.36	0.50
Procyon A	154.06	11.44	6.94
Vega	167.39	25.02	50.05
Altair	176.67	16.69	10.70
Fomalhaut A	221.33	25.13	16.67
Denebola	325.56	35.78	14.66
Castor A	341.35	50.98	49.85
Epsilon Eridani	363.35	10.50	0.50

- Successive assists at α Cen A and B could allow travel times to 75 yr to both stars.
- Lightsail has a nominal mass-to-surface ratio (σ_{nom}) of 8.6×10^{−4} gram m^{−2} for a nominal graphene-class sail.
- Area of the Lightsail, about 10^{5} m^{2} = (316 m)^{2}
- Velocity up to 37,300 km s^{−1} (12.5% c). Ref:

=== Operational constraints ===
In Earth orbit, a sail craft must operate at an altitude where the SRP exceeds the drag pressure. As drag pressure decreases with altitude this implies the existence of a minimum operational altitude (typically around 600 km, although this depends slightly on solar activity and mission application).

Sail craft must operate in orbits where the maximum angular velocity of the structure is compatible with the period of the orbits, a consideration particularly relevant in the case of planetocentric orbits, which often have a much shorter period than heliocentric orbits. For example, in the case of ACS3, the structure has a maximum angular velocity of 0.5 °/s so the design of the control strategy must not require attitude changes exceeding this rate.

Sail operating temperatures are a function of solar distance, sail angle, reflectivity, and front and back emissivities. A sail can be used only where its temperature is kept within its material limits. Generally, a sail can be used rather close to the Sun, around 0.25 AU, or even closer if carefully designed for those conditions.

== Projects operating or completed ==
=== Attitude (orientation) control ===
Both the Mariner 10 mission, which flew by the planets Mercury and Venus, and the MESSENGER mission to Mercury demonstrated the use of solar pressure as a method of attitude control in order to conserve attitude-control propellant.

Hayabusa also used solar pressure on its solar paddles as a method of attitude control to compensate for broken reaction wheels and chemical thruster.

MTSAT-1R (Multi-Functional Transport Satellite)'s solar sail counteracts the torque produced by sunlight pressure on the solar array. The trim tab on the solar array makes small adjustments to the torque balance.

=== Ground deployment tests ===
NASA has successfully tested deployment technologies on small scale sails in vacuum chambers.

In 1999, a full-scale deployment of a solar sail was tested on the ground at DLR/ESA in Cologne.

=== Suborbital tests ===
Cosmos 1, a joint private project between Planetary Society, Cosmos Studios and Russian Academy of Science attempted to launch a suborbital prototype vehicle in 2005, which was destroyed due to a rocket failure.

A 15-meter-diameter solar sail (SSP, solar sail sub payload, soraseiru sabupeiro-do) was launched together with ASTRO-F on a M-V rocket on February 21, 2006, and made it to orbit. It deployed from the stage, but opened incompletely.

On August 9, 2004, the Japanese ISAS successfully deployed two prototype solar sails from a sounding rocket. A clover-shaped sail was deployed at 122 km altitude and a fan-shaped sail was deployed at 169 km altitude. Both sails used 7.5-micrometer film. The experiment purely tested the deployment mechanisms, not propulsion.

=== Znamya 2 ===
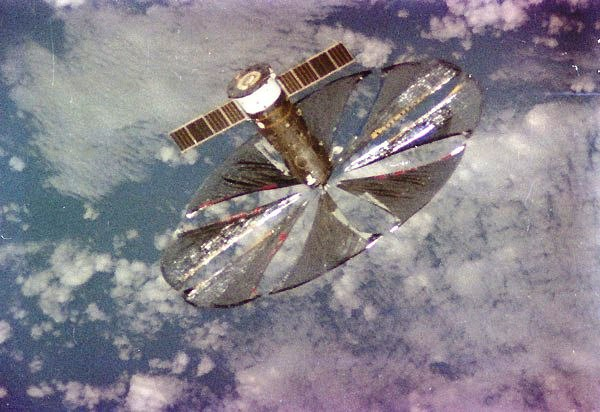
Znamya-2 (Знамя-2) after its deployment

On February 4, 1993, the Znamya 2, a 20-meter wide aluminized-mylar reflector, was successfully deployed from the Russian Mir space station. It was the first thin film reflector of such type successfully deployed in space using the mechanism based on centrifugal force. Although the deployment succeeded, propulsion was not demonstrated. A second test in 1999, Znamya 2.5, failed to deploy properly.

=== IKAROS 2010 ===
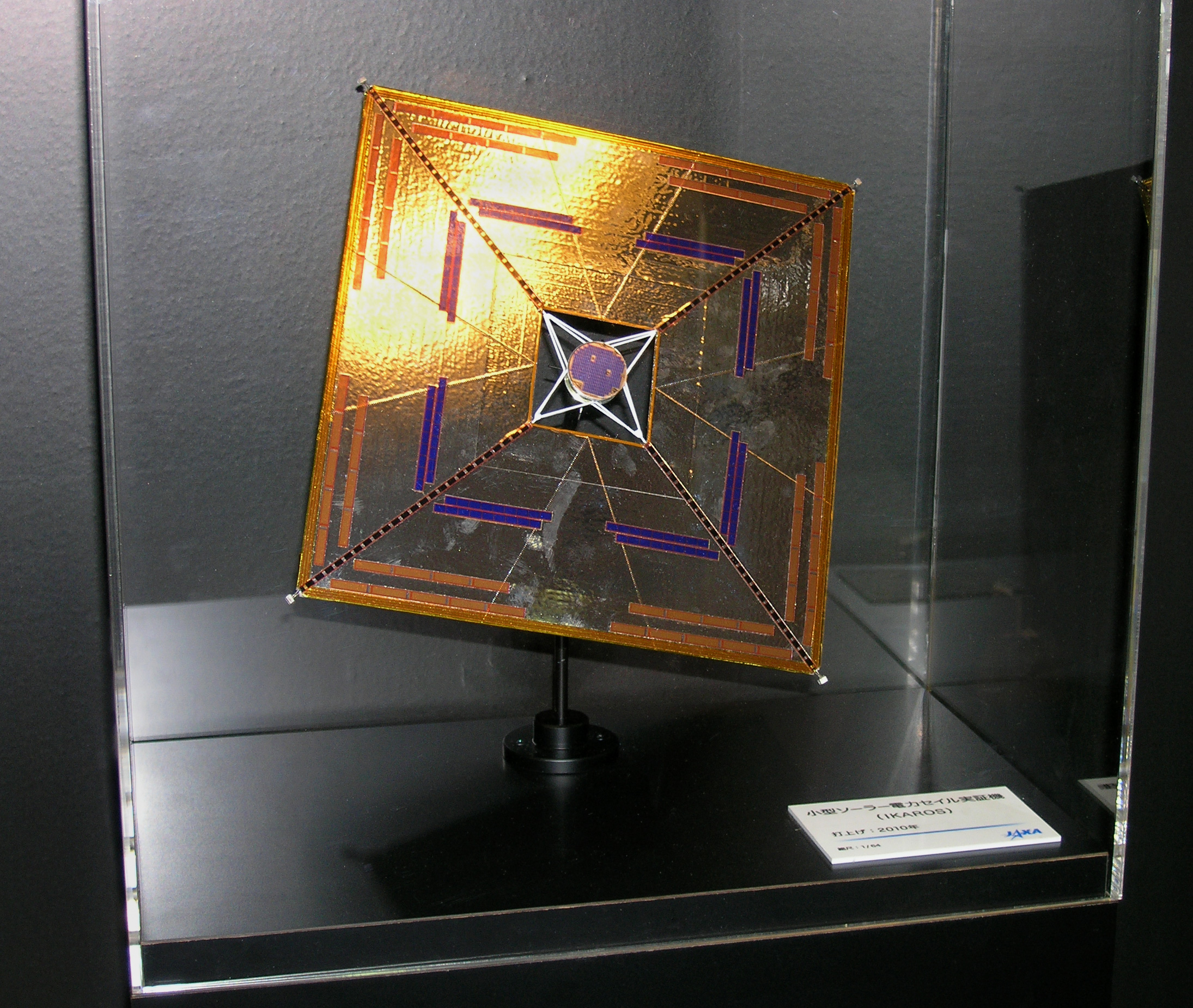
The model of IKAROS at the 61st International Astronautical Congress in 2010

On 21 May 2010, Japan Aerospace Exploration Agency (JAXA) launched the world's first interplanetary solar sail spacecraft "IKAROS" (Interplanetary Kite-craft Accelerated by Radiation Of the Sun) to Venus. Using a new solar-photon propulsion method, it was the first true solar sail spacecraft fully propelled by sunlight, and was the first spacecraft to succeed in solar sail flight.

JAXA successfully tested IKAROS in 2010. The goal was to deploy and control the sail and, for the first time, to determine the minute orbit perturbations caused by light pressure. Orbit determination was done by the nearby AKATSUKI probe from which IKAROS detached after both had been brought into a transfer orbit to Venus. The total effect over the six month flight was 100 m/s.

Until 2010, no solar sails had been successfully used in space as primary propulsion systems. On 21 May 2010, the Japan Aerospace Exploration Agency (JAXA) launched the IKAROS spacecraft, which deployed a 200 m^{2} polyimide experimental solar sail on June 10. In July, the next phase for the demonstration of acceleration by radiation began. On 9 July 2010, it was verified that IKAROS collected radiation from the Sun and began photon acceleration by the orbit determination of IKAROS by range-and-range-rate (RARR) that is newly calculated in addition to the data of the relativization accelerating speed of IKAROS between IKAROS and the Earth that has been taken since before the Doppler effect was utilized. The data showed that IKAROS appears to have been solar-sailing since 3 June when it deployed the sail.

IKAROS has a diagonal spinning square sail 14×14 m (196 m^{2}) made of a 7.5-micrometre (0.0075 mm) thick sheet of polyimide. The polyimide sheet had a mass of about 10 grams per square metre. A thin-film solar array is embedded in the sail. Eight LCD panels are embedded in the sail, whose reflectance can be adjusted for attitude control. IKAROS spent six months traveling to Venus, and then began a three-year journey to the far side of the Sun.

=== NanoSail-D 2010 ===
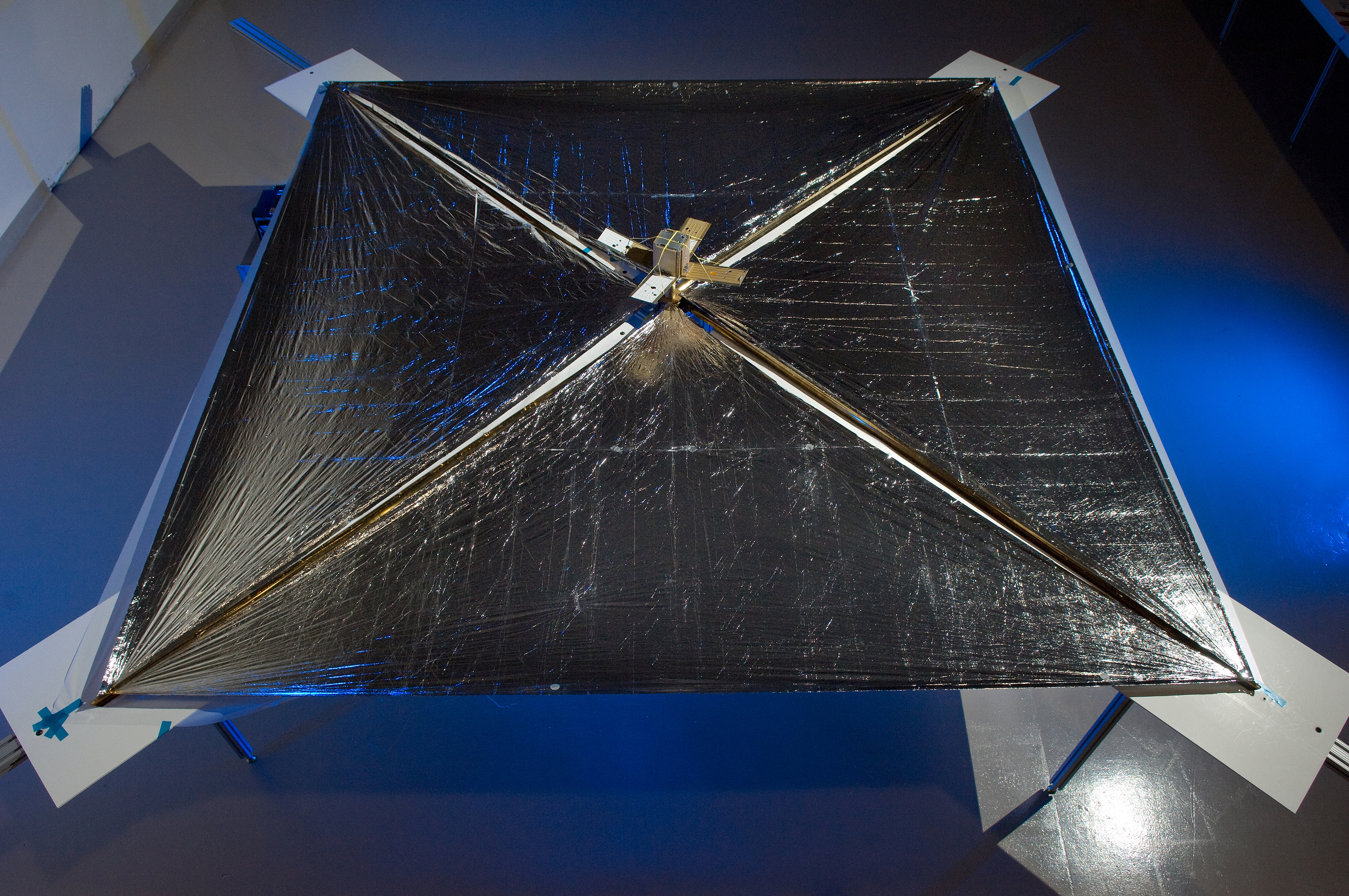
A photo of the experimental solar sail, NanoSail-D

A team from the NASA Marshall Space Flight Center (Marshall), along with a team from the NASA Ames Research Center, developed a solar sail mission called NanoSail-D, which was lost in a launch failure aboard a Falcon 1 rocket on 3 August 2008. The second backup version, NanoSail-D2, also sometimes called simply NanoSail-D, was launched with FASTSAT on a Minotaur IV on November 19, 2010, becoming NASA's first solar sail deployed in low earth orbit. The objectives of the mission were to test sail deployment technologies, and to gather data about the use of solar sails as a simple, "passive" means of de-orbiting dead satellites and space debris. The NanoSail-D structure was made of aluminium and plastic, with the spacecraft massing less than 10 pounds (4.5 kg). The sail has about 100 square feet (9.3 m^{2}) of light-catching surface. After some initial problems with deployment, the solar sail was deployed and over the course of its 240-day mission reportedly produced a "wealth of data" concerning the use of solar sails as passive deorbit devices.

NASA launched the second NanoSail-D unit stowed inside the FASTSAT satellite on the Minotaur IV on November 19, 2010. The ejection date from the FASTSAT microsatellite was planned for December 6, 2010, but deployment only occurred on January 20, 2011.

=== Planetary Society LightSail Projects ===
On June 21, 2005, a joint private project between Planetary Society, Cosmos Studios and Russian Academy of Science launched a prototype sail Cosmos 1 from a submarine in the Barents Sea, but the Volna rocket failed, and the spacecraft failed to reach orbit. They intended to use the sail to gradually raise the spacecraft to a higher Earth orbit over a mission duration of one month. The launch attempt sparked public interest according to Louis Friedman. Despite the failed launch attempt of Cosmos 1, The Planetary Society received applause for their efforts from the space community and sparked a rekindled interest in solar sail technology.

On Carl Sagan's 75th birthday (November 9, 2009) the Planetary Society announced plans to make three further attempts, dubbed LightSail-1, -2, and -3. The new design will use a 32 m^{2} Mylar sail, deployed in four triangular segments like NanoSail-D. The launch configuration is a 3U CubeSat format, and as of 2015, it was scheduled as a secondary payload for a 2016 launch on the first SpaceX Falcon Heavy launch.

"LightSail-1" was launched on 20 May 2015. The purpose of the test was to allow a full checkout of the satellite's systems in advance of LightSail-2. Its deployment orbit was not high enough to escape Earth's atmospheric drag and demonstrate true solar sailing.

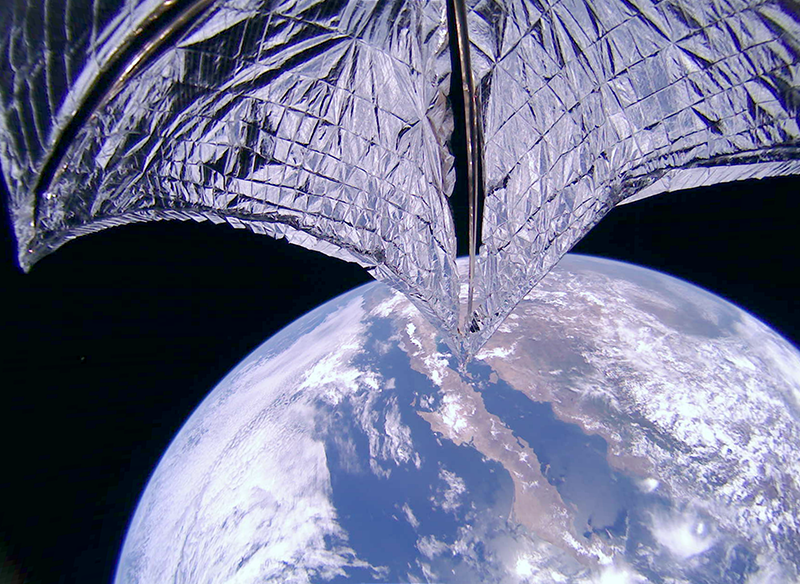
Deployed LightSail-2

"LightSail-2" was launched on 25 June 2019, and deployed into a much higher low Earth orbit. Its solar sails were deployed on 23 July 2019. It reentered the atmosphere on 17 November 2022. LightSail-2 successfully demonstrated propulsion by solar sail.

=== NEA Scout ===
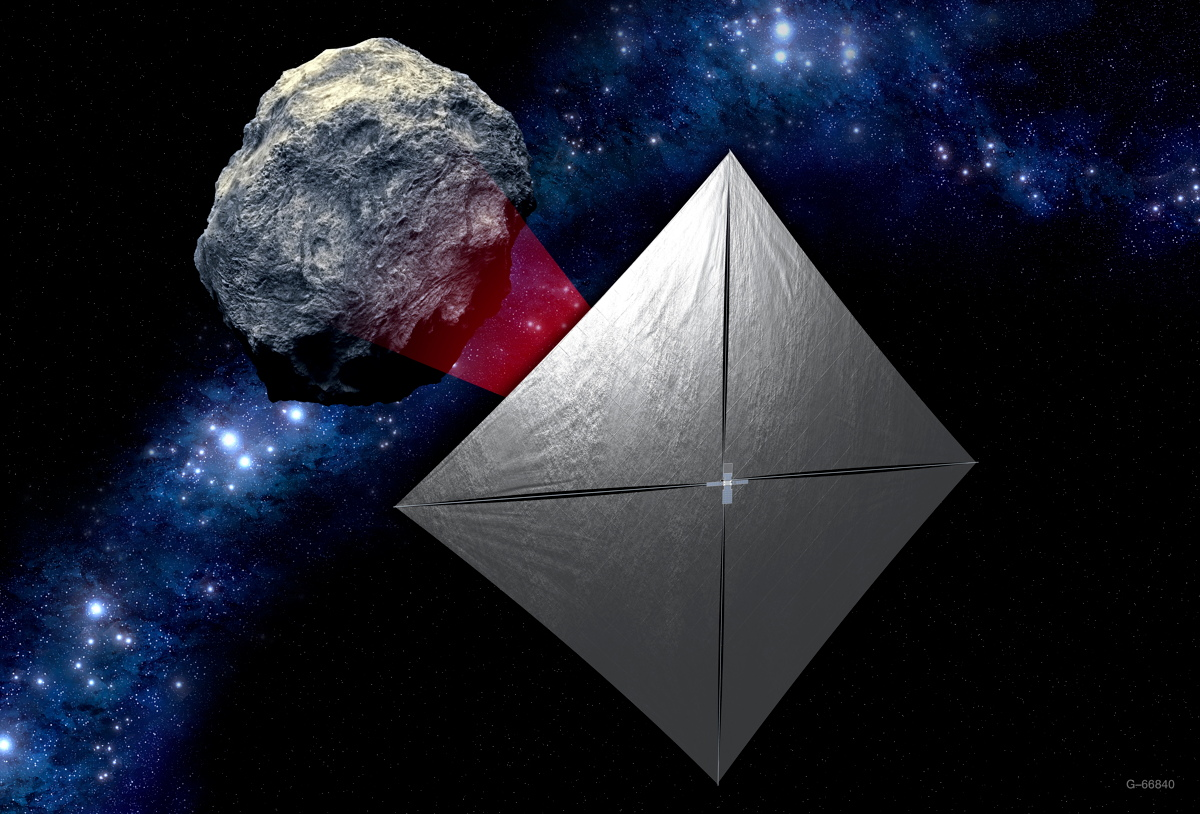
NEA Scout concept: a controllable CubeSat solar sail spacecraft

The Near-Earth Asteroid Scout (NEA Scout) was a mission jointly developed by NASA's Marshall Space Flight Center (MSFC) and the Jet Propulsion Laboratory (JPL), consisting of a controllable low-cost CubeSat solar sail spacecraft capable of encountering near-Earth asteroids (NEA). Four 7 m (23 ft) booms were to deploy, unfurling the 83 m^{2} (890 sq ft) aluminized polyimide solar sail. In 2015, NASA announced it had selected NEA Scout to launch as one of several secondary payloads aboard Artemis 1, the first flight of the agency's heavy-lift SLS launch vehicle. However, the craft was considered lost with the failure to establish communications shortly after launch in 2022.

=== Advanced Composite Solar Sail System (ACS3) ===
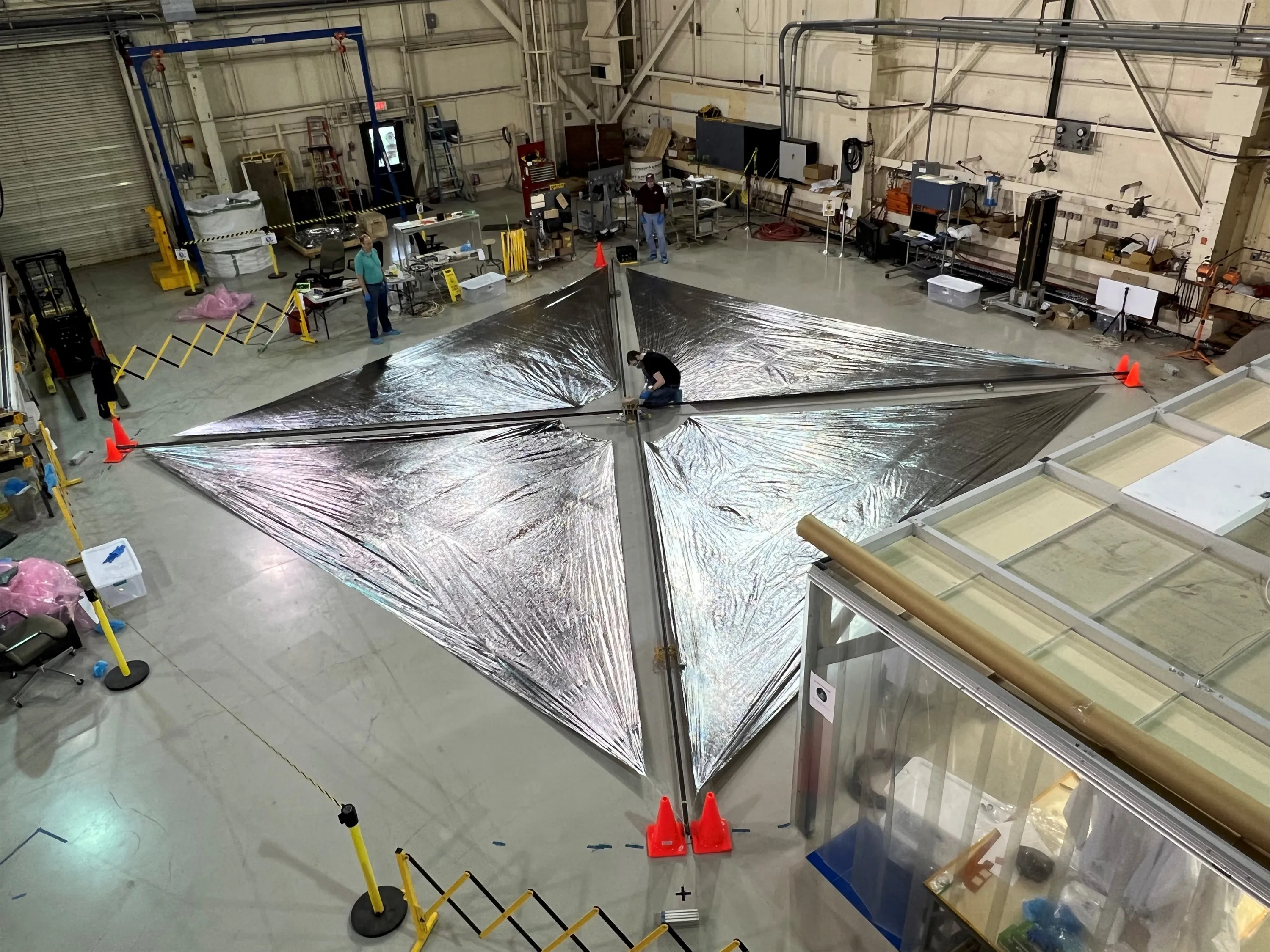
Advanced Composite Solar Sail System testing

The NASA Advanced Composite Solar Sail System (ACS3) is a technology demonstration of solar sail technology for future small spacecraft. It was selected in 2019 by NASA's CubeSat Launch Initiative (CSLI) to be launched as part of the ELaNa program.

ACS3 consists of a 12U (unit) CubeSat small satellite (23 cm x 23 cm x 34 cm; 16 kg) that unfolds a quadratic 80 square metres (860 sq ft) solar sail consisting of a polyethylene naphthalate film coated on one side with aluminum for reflectivity and on the other side with chromium to increase thermal emissivity. The sail is held by a novel unfolding system of four 7 metres (23 ft) long carbon fiber reinforced polymer booms that roll-up for storage.

ACS3 was launched on 23 April 2024 on the Electron "Beginning Of The Swarm" mission. The ACS3 successfully made contact with ground stations following deployment in early May. The solar sail was confirmed as successfully operational by mission operators on 29 August 2024.

On 25 October 2024 it was reported "... a bent support arm has made it (ACS3) lose direction and spin out of control in space."

== Projects proposed or cancelled or not selected ==
Despite the losses of Cosmos 1 and NanoSail-D (about 23cm x 23cm x 34cm) which were due to failure of their launchers, scientists and engineers around the world remain encouraged and continue to work on solar sails. While most direct applications created so far intend to use the sails as inexpensive modes of cargo transport, some scientists are investigating the possibility of using solar sails as a means of transporting humans. This goal is strongly related to the management of very large (i.e. well above 1 km^{2}) surfaces in space and the sail making advancements. Development of solar sails for crewed space flight is still in its infancy.

=== Sunjammer 2015 ===
A technology demonstration sail craft, dubbed Sunjammer, was in development with the intent to prove the viability and value of sailing technology. Sunjammer had a square sail, 38 metres (125 ft) wide on each side, giving it an effective area of 1,200 square metres (13,000 sq ft). It would have traveled from the Sun-Earth L_{1} Lagrangian point 1.5 million kilometres (930,000 miles) from Earth to a distance of 3 million kilometres (1.9 million miles). The demonstration was expected to launch on a Falcon 9 in January 2015. It would have been a secondary payload, released after the placement of the DSCOVR climate satellite at the L1 point. Citing a lack of confidence in the ability of its contractor L'Garde to deliver, the mission was cancelled by NASA in October 2014.

=== OKEANOS ===
OKEANOS (Outsized Kite-craft for Exploration and Astronautics in the Outer Solar System) was a proposed mission concept by Japan's JAXA to Jupiter's Trojan asteroids using a hybrid solar sail for propulsion; the sail would have been covered with thin solar panels to power an ion engine. In-situ analysis of the collected samples would have been performed by either direct contact or using a lander carrying a high-resolution mass spectrometer. A lander and a sample-return to Earth were options under study. The OKEANOS Jupiter Trojan Asteroid Explorer was a finalist for Japan's ISAS' 2nd Large-class mission to be launched in the late 2020s. However, it was not selected.

=== Solar Cruiser ===
In August 2019, NASA awarded the Solar Cruiser team $400,000 for nine-month mission concept studies. The spacecraft would have a 1,672 m^{2} (18,000 sq ft) solar sail and would orbit the Sun in a polar orbit, while the coronagraph instrument would enable simultaneous measurements of the Sun's magnetic field structure and velocity of coronal mass ejections. If selected for further development, it would have launched in 2025. However, Solar Cruiser was not approved to advance to phase C of its development cycle and was subsequently discontinued.

== Projects still in development or unknown status ==
=== Gossamer deorbit sail ===
As of December 2013, the European Space Agency (ESA) has a proposed deorbit sail, named "Gossamer", that would be intended to be used to accelerate the deorbiting of small (less than 700 kilograms (1,500 lb)) artificial satellites from low Earth orbits. The launch mass is 2 kilograms (4.4 lb) with a launch volume of only 15×15×25 centimetres (0.49×0.49×0.82 ft). Once deployed, the sail would expand to 5 by 5 metres (16 ft × 16 ft) and would use a combination of solar pressure on the sail and increased atmospheric drag to accelerate satellite reentry.

=== Breakthrough Starshot ===
The well-funded Breakthrough Starshot project, announced in 2016, aimed to build 1000 light-sail nanocraft carrying miniature cameras, and propel them by ground-based lasers to Alpha Centauri at 20% the speed of light, a 20-year trip. In 2025, it was reported that there were no plans to continue the project.

== In popular culture ==
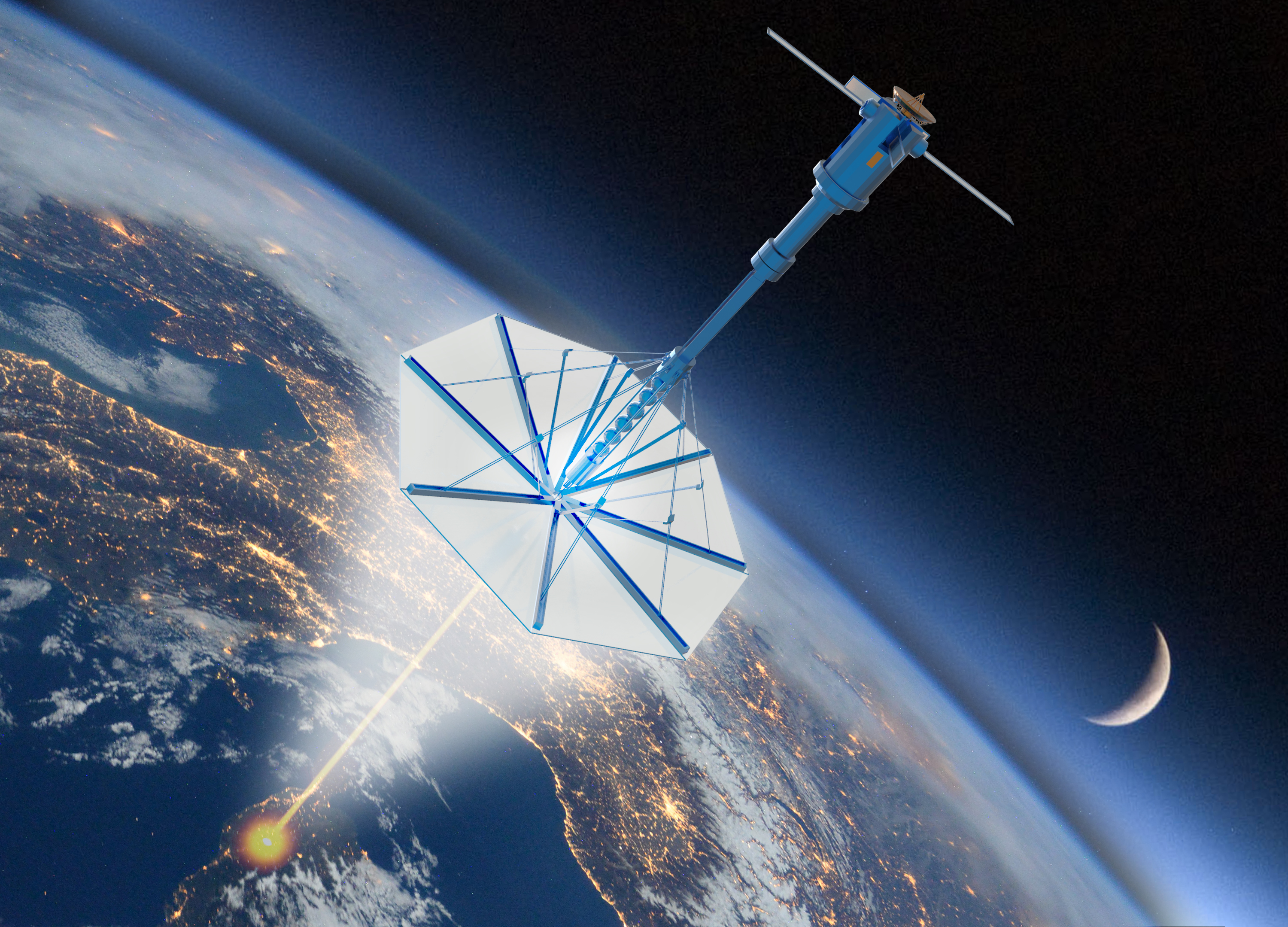
Artist rendering of an interstellar light sail space craft

Cordwainer Smith gives a description of solar-sail-powered spaceships in "The Lady Who Sailed The Soul", published first in April 1960.

Jack Vance wrote a short story about a training mission on a solar-sail-powered spaceship in "Sail 25", published in 1961.

Arthur C. Clarke and Poul Anderson (writing as Winston P. Sanders) independently published stories featuring solar sails, both stories titled "Sunjammer," in 1964. Clarke retitled his story "The Wind from the Sun" when it was reprinted, in order to avoid confusion.

In Larry Niven and Jerry Pournelle's 1974 novel The Mote in God's Eye, aliens are discovered when their laser-sail propelled probe enters human space.

A similar technology was the theme in the Star Trek: Deep Space Nine episode "Explorers". In the episode, Lightships are described as an ancient technology used by Bajorans to travel beyond their solar system by using light from the Bajoran sun and specially constructed sails to propel them through space ("Explorers". Star Trek: Deep Space Nine. Season 3. Episode 22.).

In the 2002 Star Wars film Attack of the Clones, the main villain Count Dooku was seen using a spacecraft with solar sails.

In the 2002 animated movie Treasure Planet, the ships in the movie use solar sails to propel themselves, although they appear to be thruster assisted and act more like sailing watercraft then spaceships.

In the 2009 film Avatar, the spacecraft which transports the protagonist Jake Sully to the Alpha Centauri system, the ISV Venture Star, uses solar sails as a means of propulsion to accelerate the vehicle away from the Earth towards Alpha Centauri.

In the third season of Apple TV+'s alternate history TV show For All Mankind, the fictional NASA spaceship Sojourner 1 utilises solar sails for additional propulsion on its way to Mars.

In the 2022 show Pantheon, a solar sail is used to send the SafeSurf program to Alpha Centauri.

In the final episode of the first season of 2024 Netflix TV show, 3 Body Problem, one of the protagonists, Will Downing, has his cryogenically frozen brain launched into space toward the oncoming Trisolarian spaceship, using solar sails and nuclear pulse propulsion to accelerate it to a fraction of the speed of light.

== See also ==
- Extraterrestrial: The First Sign of Intelligent Life Beyond Earth – 2021 book by Avi Loeb
- Optical lift – Lifting force due to light
- Poynting–Robertson effect – Process whereby solar radiation causes orbiting dust grains to lose angular momentum
- Technosignature – Property that provides scientific evidence for the presence of technology
- Yarkovsky effect – Force on a rotating celestial body due to asymmetric thermal radiation

== Bibliography ==
- G. Vulpetti, Fast Solar Sailing: Astrodynamics of Special Sailcraft Trajectories, Space Technology Library Vol. 30, Springer, August 2012, (Hardcover) https://www.springer.com/engineering/mechanical+engineering/book/978-94-007-4776-0, (Kindle-edition), ASIN: B00A9YGY4I
- G. Vulpetti, L. Johnson, G. L. Matloff, Solar Sails: A Novel Approach to Interplanetary Flight, Springer, August 2015, ISBN 978-1-4939-0940-7
- J. L. Wright, Space Sailing, Gordon and Breach Science Publishers, London, 1992; Wright was involved with JPL's effort to use a solar sail for a rendezvous with Halley's comet.
- NASA/CR 2002-211730, Chapter IV— presents an optimized escape trajectory via the H-reversal sailing mode
- G. Vulpetti, The Sailcraft Splitting Concept, JBIS, Vol. 59, pp. 48–53, February 2006
- G. L. Matloff, Deep-Space Probes: To the Outer Solar System and Beyond, 2nd ed., Springer-Praxis, UK, 2005, ISBN 978-3-540-24772-2
- T. Taylor, D. Robinson, T. Moton, T. C. Powell, G. Matloff, and J. Hall, "Solar Sail Propulsion Systems Integration and Analysis (for Option Period)", Final Report for NASA/MSFC, Contract No. H-35191D Option Period, Teledyne Brown Engineering Inc., Huntsville, AL, May 11, 2004
- G. Vulpetti, "Sailcraft Trajectory Options for the Interstellar Probe: Mathematical Theory and Numerical Results", the Chapter IV of NASA/CR-2002-211730, The Interstellar Probe (ISP): Pre-Perihelion Trajectories and Application of Holography, June 2002
- G. Vulpetti, Sailcraft-Based Mission to The Solar Gravitational Lens, STAIF-2000, Albuquerque (New Mexico, USA), 30 January – 3 February 2000
- G. Vulpetti, "General 3D H-Reversal Trajectories for High-Speed Sailcraft", Acta Astronautica, Vol. 44, No. 1, pp. 67–73, 1999
- C. R. McInnes, Solar Sailing: Technology, Dynamics, and Mission Applications, Springer-Praxis Publishing Ltd, Chichester, UK, 1999, ISBN 978-3-540-21062-7
- Genta, G., and Brusa, E., "The AURORA Project: a New Sail Layout", Acta Astronautica, 44, No. 2–4, pp. 141–146 (1999)
- S. Scaglione and G. Vulpetti, "The Aurora Project: Removal of Plastic Substrate to Obtain an All-Metal Solar Sail", special issue of Acta Astronautica, vol. 44, No. 2–4, pp. 147–150, 1999
- Fu, Bo; Sperber, Evan; Eke, Fidelis (2016). "Solar sail technology—A state of the art review". Progress in Aerospace Sciences. 86: 1–19. Bibcode:2016PrAeS..86....1F. doi:10.1016/j.paerosci.2016.07.001.
- Gong, Shengping; Macdonald, Malcolm (2019). "Review on solar sail technology". Astrodynamics. 3 (2): 93–125. Bibcode:2019AsDyn...3...93G. doi:10.1007/s42064-019-0038-x.
- Zhao, Pengyuan; Wu, Chenchen; Li, Yangmin (2023). "Design and application of solar sailing: A review on key technologies". Chinese Journal of Aeronautics. 36 (5): 125–144. Bibcode:2023ChJAn..36e.125Z. doi:10.1016/j.cja.2022.11.002. hdl:10397/102365.
