= Science-Enabling Technologies for Heliophysics =

Proposed space mission

Science-Enabling Technologies for Heliophysics (SETH)
- Mission type: Technology demonstration
- Operator: NASA

Start of mission
- Launch date: October 2024 (proposed)

Orbital parameters
- Reference system: Geocentric

Science-Enabling Technologies for Heliophysics (SETH) is a proposed space mission by NASA's Goddard Space Flight Center to launch a small satellite that would demonstrate new technologies to detect solar energetic particles, and demonstrate an optical communication system based on laser pulses.

The Principal Investigator for SETH is Antti Pulkkinen at NASA's Goddard Space Flight Center in Greenbelt, Maryland.

== Overview ==
Its science payload would be a novel detector of solar energetic neutral atoms (ENA), as well as an array of waves and other Solar energetic particles (SEP) that erupt from the Sun. The instrument is called the HELio Energetic Neutral Atom (HELENA) detector. This technology could enable advanced warnings of potential space radiation threats to astronauts. Its second payload would be an optical communications technology for small satellites and CubeSats that could enable a hundred-fold increase in deep space data rates.

SETH was awarded $400,000 for nine-month mission concept studies to be presented to the Heliophysics Solar Terrestrial Probes program, which is managed by NASA's Goddard Space Flight Center in Greenbelt, Maryland. If selected for development, it would launch in October 2024 on a rideshare with the Interstellar Mapping and Acceleration Probe (IMAP).

== See also ==
- Laser communication in space
- Deep Space Optical Communications
