= Solar Cruiser =

Proposed NASA spacecraft to study the Sun

- Mission type: Technology, Heliophysics
- Operator: NASA

Spacecraft properties
- Spacecraft type: Solar sail
- Dimensions: Sail: 1,672 m^{2} (18,000 sq ft)

Start of mission
- Launch date: February 2025 (proposed)
- Rocket: Falcon 9 Block 5
- Launch site: Cape Canaveral, SLC-40
- Contractor: SpaceX

Sun orbiter

Orbital parameters
- Inclination: Polar

Instruments
- Coronagraph

Solar Cruiser was a planned NASA spacecraft that would have studied the Sun while propelled by a solar sail. The mission would have supported NASA's Solar Terrestrial Probes program by studying how interplanetary space changes in response to the constant outpouring of energy and particles from the Sun and how it interacts with planetary atmospheres. It was expected to launch as a rideshare payload alongside IMAP in February 2025. However, the spacecraft was not selected for further development and project closeout efforts concluded in 2023.

The principal investigator was Les Johnson at NASA's Marshall Space Flight Center in Huntsville, Alabama.

== Overview ==
The mission had been selected to launch along with NASA's Interstellar Mapping and Acceleration Probe (IMAP) and Global Lyman-alpha Imagers of the Dynamic Exosphere (GLIDE). The Solar Cruiser spacecraft would have demonstrated solar sailing around the Sun at an unusual polar orbit, while its coronagraph instrument would enable simultaneous measurements of the Sun's magnetic field structure and velocity of coronal mass ejections. The craft's nearly 1,672 m^{2} (18,000 sq ft) solar sail was expected to demonstrate the ability to use solar radiation as propulsion and facilitate views of the Sun not easily accessible with current technology, such as a close-up view of its poles.

Solar Cruiser was awarded US$65 million for mission execution. Previously, US$400,000 for nine-month mission concept studies was presented to the Heliophysics Solar Terrestrial Probes program, which is managed by NASA's Goddard Space Flight Center in Greenbelt, Maryland. However, Solar Cruiser was not approved for advancement to phase C of its development cycle.
