= Pluto Energetic Particle Spectrometer Science Investigation =

Instrument on the New Horizons space probe

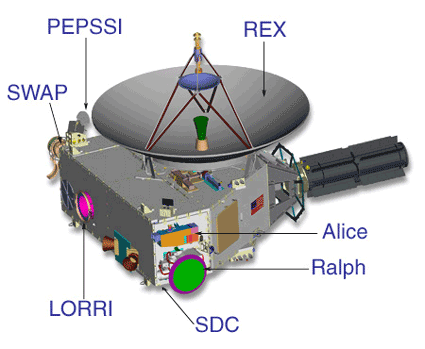
The location of PEPSSI among the seven instruments on New Horizons is pointed to

Pluto Energetic Particle Spectrometer Science Investigation (PEPSSI), is an instrument on the New Horizons space probe to Pluto and beyond, it is designed to measure ions and electrons. Specifically, it is focused on measuring ions escaping from the atmosphere of Pluto during the 2015 flyby. It is one of seven major scientific instruments aboard the spacecraft. The spacecraft was launched in 2006, flew by Jupiter the following year, and went on to flyby Pluto in 2015 where PEPSSI was able to record and transmit back to Earth its planned data collections.

PEPSSI is designed to help understand the rate of atmospheric loss from the atmosphere of Pluto into space, which is thought experience comet-like atmosphere loss into outer space. These ions blend in with the surrounding solar wind which passed by Pluto. During the flyby PEPSSI sent data back to Earth every day. During the journey to Pluto, PEPSSI was also used to record data about the interplanetary medium. Data about Jupiter and its magnetotail was also collected by PEPSSI during its 2007 flyby of that planet. Beyond Pluto and into the Kuiper belt, PEPSSI can be used to study how the solar wind interacts with interstellar wind, adding to the data pile from the Voyager's which also exited the Solar System in a similar direction as the trajectory of New Horizons.

One of the expectations that was not confirmed by PEPSSI was that sunlight would make a large bubble of ionized gases around Pluto from its atmosphere. PEPSSI found that the rate of atmospheric loss was only 0.01 percent of what was anticipated, and the region of interaction with the solar wind was much smaller than expected.

== Design ==
PEPSSI is one of the seven major instruments on New Horizons, and along with SWAP is designed to detect ions. Ions come in and pass through two foils, which when they pass through these foils they are timed, then they hit a solid state detector. The time of flight between the two foils helps determine the particles mass, and the detector measures the energy, and from this the composition of the particle can be determined within certain parameters. The instrument is designed to "taste" the atmosphere of Pluto, and design is oriented towards being low weight, low power, and understanding the nature of atmospheric loss from Pluto.

PEPPSI is a compact low-power ion measurement device, and it is a time of flight type of instrument The design detects ions from about 10 keV to 1 MeV in a fan shaped160 degree by 12 degree arc. The device has a mass of 1.5 kg (3.31 lb) and can consume about 2.5 watts of electrical power. The ionized particles pass through two microchannel plates, with the time recorded for the time between these detections. After passing through this section, there is a solid state silicon detector. The design avoided using magnets for the time of flight section, which enhanced weight and/or power savings for the instrument. The instruments sensor and collimator are integrated to form the sensor module, which is mounted on board the electronic board stack.

The 160 by 12 degree field of view is covered by six detectors each with a 25 by 12 degree field of view. By noting which detector the particle has arrived at, its overall direction of input can be noted.

To meet the low power use and weight requirements, the device made use of application-specific integrated circuits (ASICs). Additional power saving decisions involved the use of lower current Micro Channel Plates, a newly designed low-voltage power supply, and a re-designed time-of-flight circuit board with a higher gain and reduced power usage.

PEPSSI is based on an instrument that was on board the Discovery program's MESSENGER (planet Mercury orbiter, launched 2004/ended 2015) called the Energetic Particle Spectrometer. PEPSSI complements the focus of SWAP, which is oriented towards lower energy ions. Whereas PEPSSI measures ions with energies from about 10 keV to 1000 keV, SWAP measures ions from 25 to 7.5 keV. PEPSSI's electron detectors are capable of measuring energetic electronics with a range of 25KeV - 500KeV. An aluminium layer is also present to filter out protons and ions.

PEPSSI has an enhanced design to reduce weight and power consumption having to do with electron detection, with heritage going back the 1980s and 1990s. The instrument on MESSENGER was based on an instrument for that periods proposals for a Pluto flyby mission. The design can trace back to some heritage to instruments in the 1980s for detecting ions.

== Specifications ==
Specs:

- Mass: 1.5 kilograms (3.31 pounds); 1475 grams
- Power use: ~2.5 watts
- Field of view: 160°×12°
- Ion energy detection range: 20 keV to 1 MeV

== See also ==
- MAVEN (Mars orbiter that also focused on studying planetary atmospheric interaction with the Solar System medium)
- Coma (cometary)
- JEDI (energetic particle detector on the Jupiter orbiter of the 2010s)
- Jovian Auroral Distributions Experiment (spacecraft instruments detects ions)
- IS☉IS (energetic particle detector instrument on the Parker Solar Probe, launched in 2018 to the Sun)
- List of New Horizons topics
- Pepsi (similar sounding American soft-drink, also sent into space on Space Shuttle)
- Pickup ions
