= Interstellar Mapping and Acceleration Probe =

NASA heliophysics mission

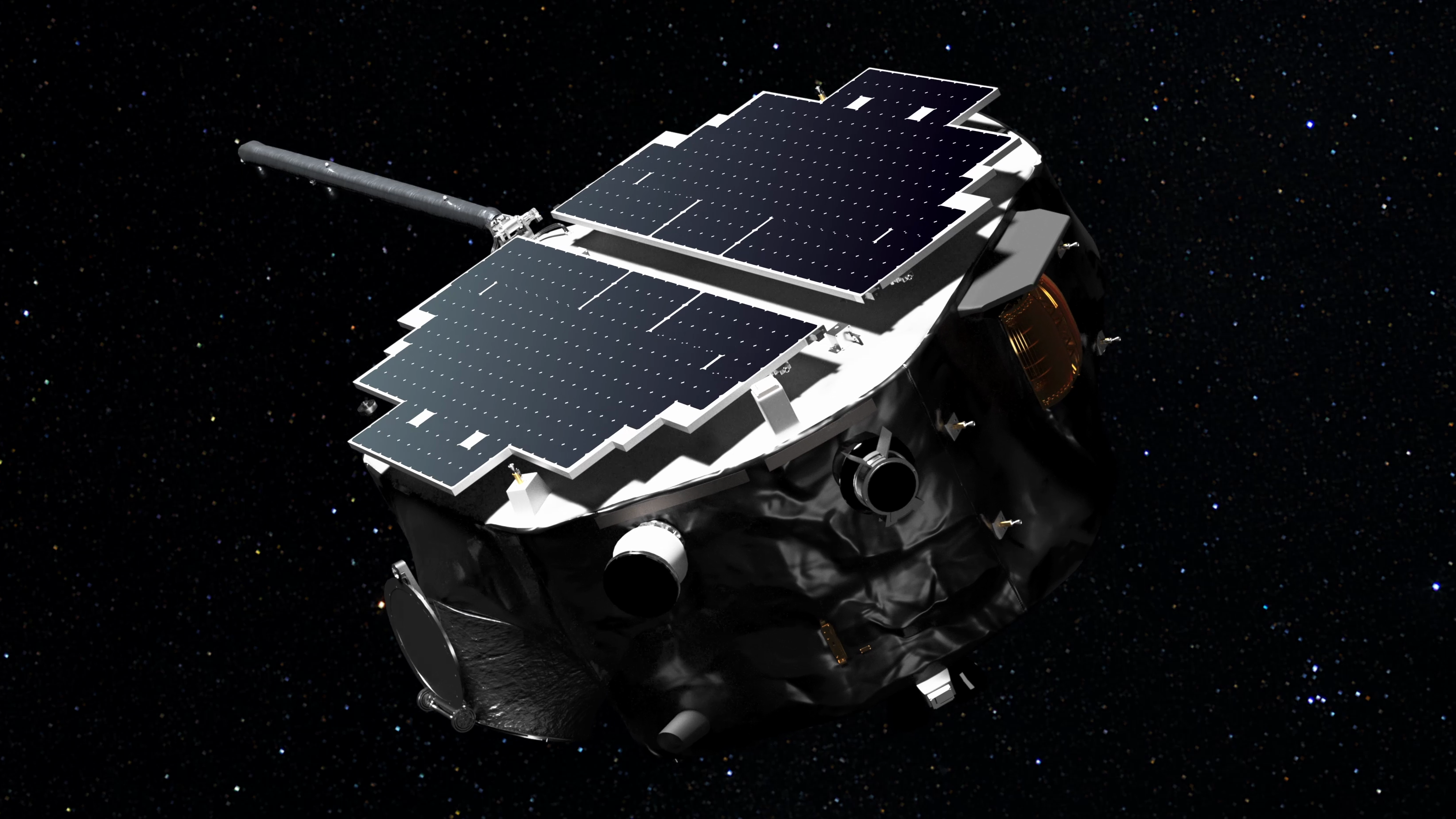
- Rendering of IMAP
- Names: IMAP
- Mission type: Heliophysics
- Operator: Princeton University
- COSPAR ID: 2025-215A
- SATCAT no.: 65725
- Website: imap.princeton.edu
- Mission duration: 2–5 years (planned); 1 year, 1 month and 23 days (elapsed)

Spacecraft properties
- Manufacturer: Applied Physics Laboratory
- Launch mass: 900 kg (1,984 lb)
- Dry mass: 756 kg (1,667 lb)
- Dimensions: 2.4 m × 0.9 m (7.9 ft × 3.0 ft)

Start of mission
- Launch date: 24 September 2025, 11:30 UTC
- Rocket: Falcon 9
- Launch site: Kennedy Space Center, LC-39A
- Contractor: SpaceX

Orbital parameters
- Reference system: Heliocentric
- Regime: Halo orbit (L1)
- Perigee altitude: ~1.6 million km (0.99 million mi)
Instruments
- IMAP–Lo: IMAP–Lo
- IMAP–Hi: IMAP–Hi
- IMAP–Ultra: IMAP–Ultra
- SWAPI: Solar Wind and Pick-up Ion
- SWE: Solar Wind Electron
- CoDICE: Compact Dual Ion Composition Experiment
- HIT: High-energy Ion Telescope
- MAG: Magnetometer
- IDEX: Interstellar Dust Experiment
- GLOWS: Global Solar Wind Structure

The Interstellar Mapping and Acceleration Probe (IMAP) is a heliophysics mission that simultaneously investigates two important and coupled science topics in the heliosphere: the acceleration of energetic particles and interaction of the solar wind with the local interstellar medium. These science topics are coupled because particles accelerated in the inner heliosphere play crucial roles in the outer heliospheric interaction. In 2018, NASA selected a team led by David J. McComas of Princeton University to implement the mission. IMAP is a Sun-tracking spin-stabilized satellite in orbit about the Sun–Earth L1 Lagrange point with a science payload of ten instruments. IMAP also continuously broadcasts real-time in-situ data that can be used for space weather prediction. It is the fifth mission selected in the Solar Terrestrial Probes program, after TIMED, Hinode, STEREO and MMS. IMAP launched on 24 September 2025.

== Science ==
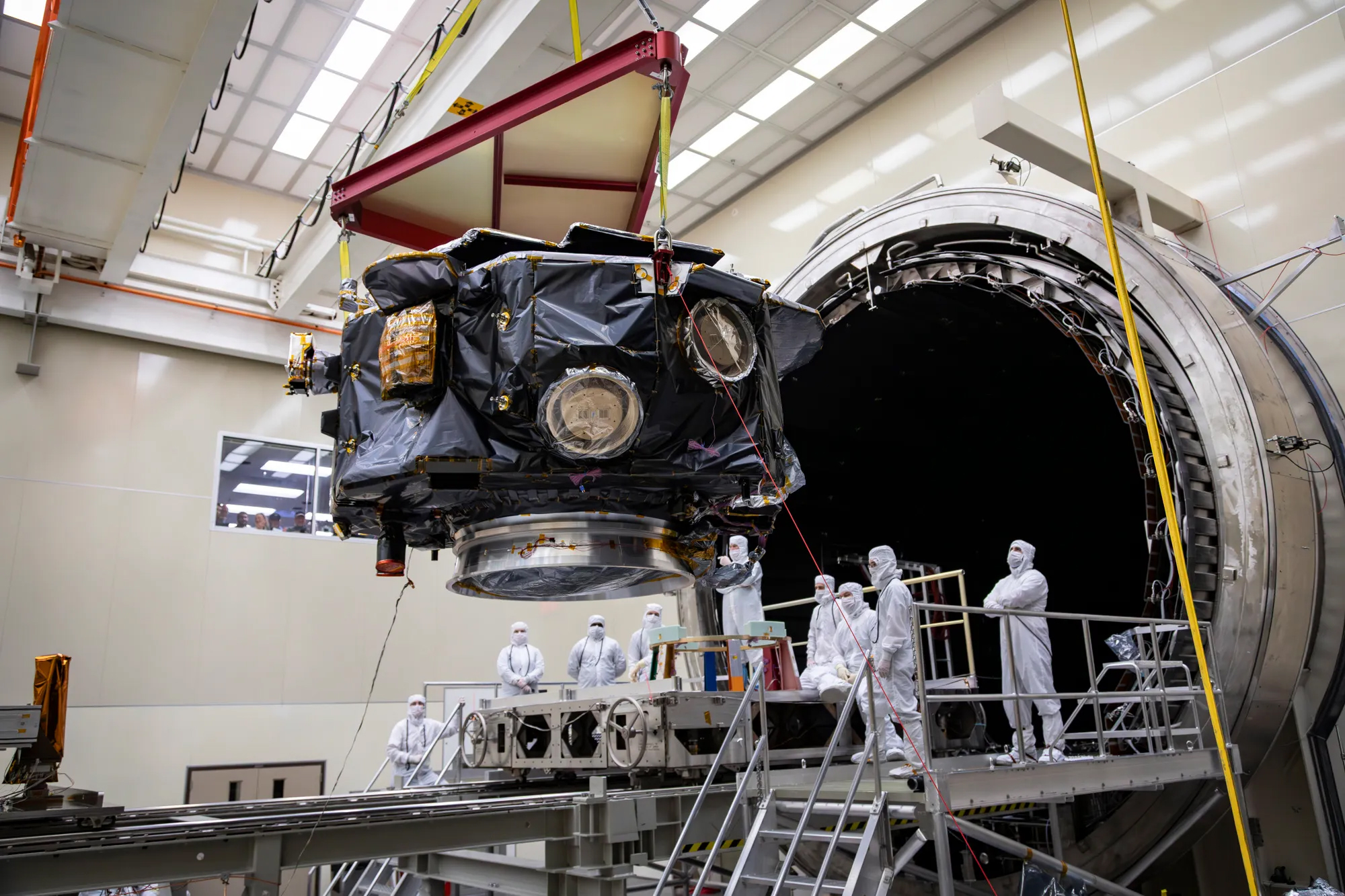
Team members install IMAP into the XRCF Chamber at Marshall Space Space Flight Center before the start of the thermal vacuum test.

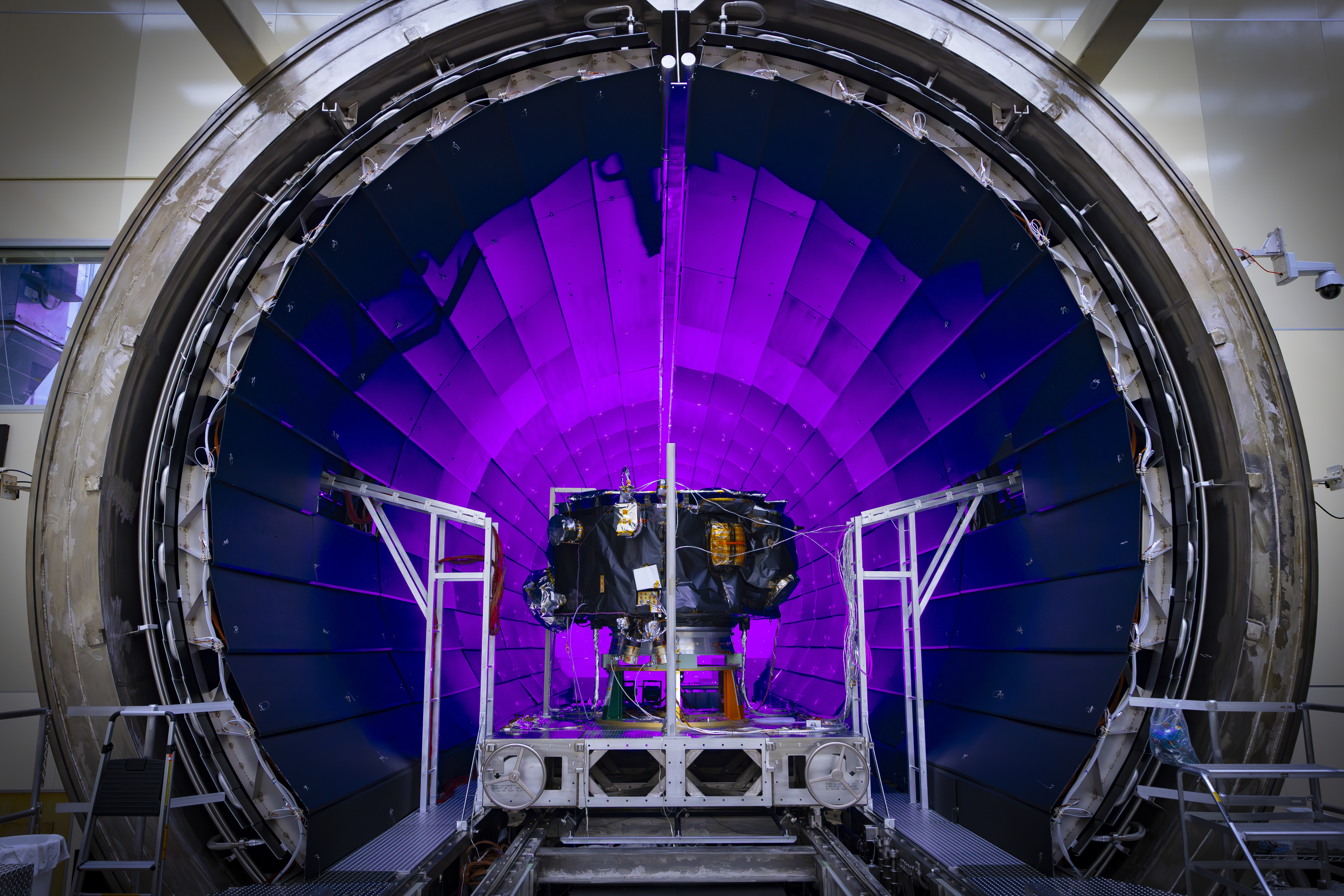
IMAP in the NASA Marshall's XRCF thermal vacuum chamber where it was tested to simulate the harsh environment of space.

Acceleration of charged particles up to high energy is ubiquitous throughout the universe, occurring at stars, magnetospheres, black holes, neutron stars, supernova remnants, and other locations. The precise processes behind this acceleration are not well understood. There are intermediate suprathermal particles which have energies between the energetic particles and the bulk thermal plasma. Understanding how these particles are energized and how they interact with the material within and beyond our solar neighborhood is one of the science topics that IMAP investigates.

The solar wind and its associated magnetic field have blown a bubble in interstellar space called the heliosphere. IMAP studies the heliosphere boundary where the solar wind collides with material from the rest of the galaxy. Using Energetic Neutral Atoms (ENAs), IMAP images this interaction region from the inner Solar System. In addition, IMAP also directly measures the neutral particles of the interstellar medium, because they flow through the heliosphere relatively undisturbed.

IMAP also investigates the source of the IBEX ribbon.

IMAP's science goals are based on the four science objectives specified in the IMAP Announcement of Opportunity. IMAP will advance the understanding of:

- The composition and properties of the local interstellar medium.
- How magnetic fields interact from the Sun through the local interstellar medium.
- How the solar wind and interstellar medium interact through the boundaries of our heliosphere.
- How particles are accelerated to high energies throughout the solar system.

== Mission ==
=== Profile ===
After launch, the spacecraft took several months to transit to about 1,500,000 km (930,000 mi) away from Earth towards the Sun at what is called the first Lagrange point (L1). The spacecraft then used on-board propulsion to insert into an +/−9.5° ×+/-3.9° Lissajous orbit around L1, very similar to the orbit of Advanced Composition Explorer (ACE). The baseline mission is 2 years, but all expendables are designed for a lifetime of more than 5 years.

Animation of IMAP

Around the Earth

Around the Sun - Frame rotating with Earth - Top view

Around the Sun - Frame rotating with Earth - Viewed from the Sun

IMAP · Earth · Sun-Earth L1

=== Spacecraft ===
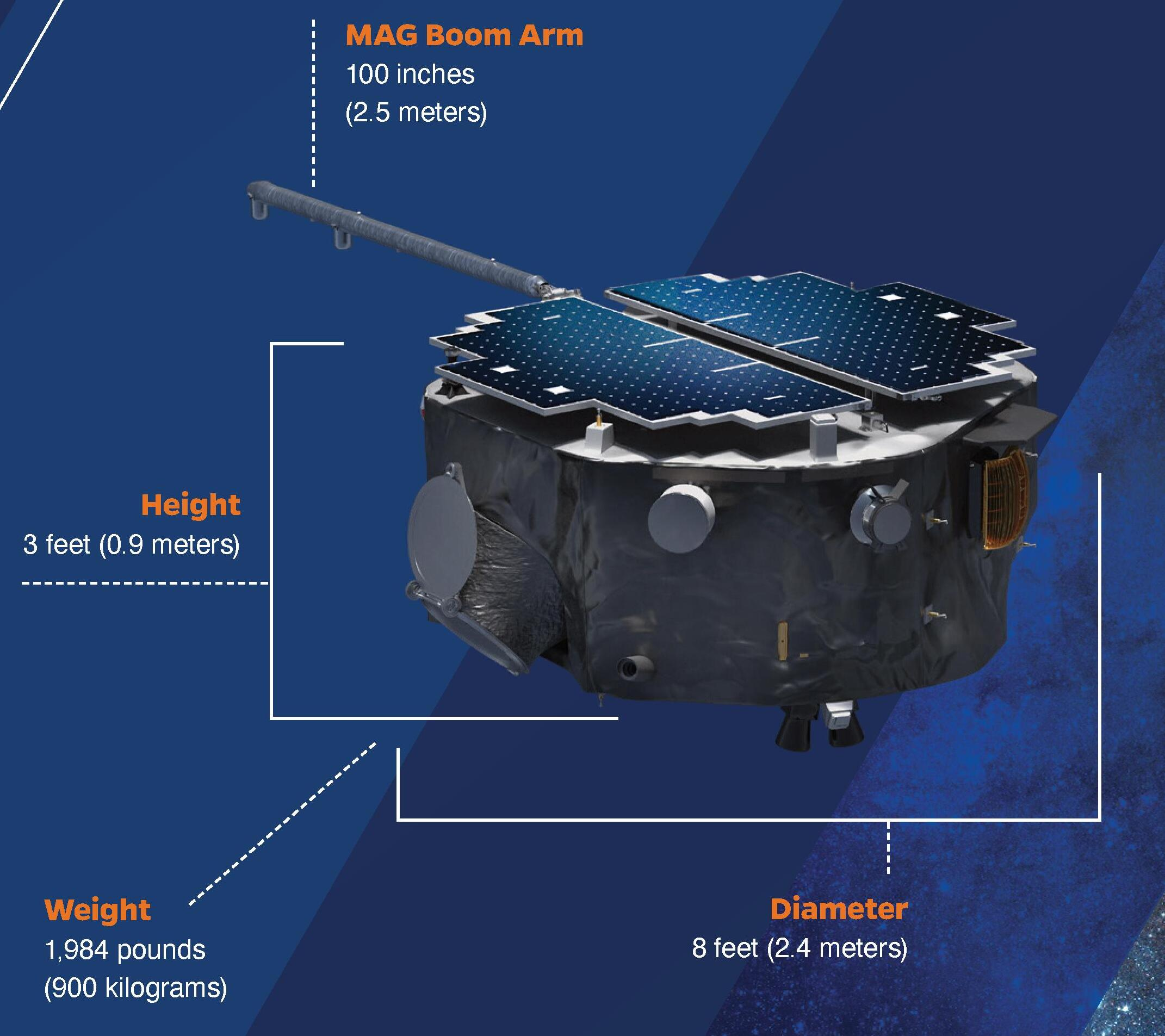
IMAP

IMAP is a simple spin-stabilized (~4 RPM) spacecraft with ten instruments. Daily attitude maneuvers are used to keep the spin axis and top deck (with solar arrays) pointed in the direction of the incoming solar wind, which is a few degrees away from the Sun. In the L1 Lissajous orbit, the rear deck, with its communication antenna, approximately points at the Earth.

=== Instruments ===
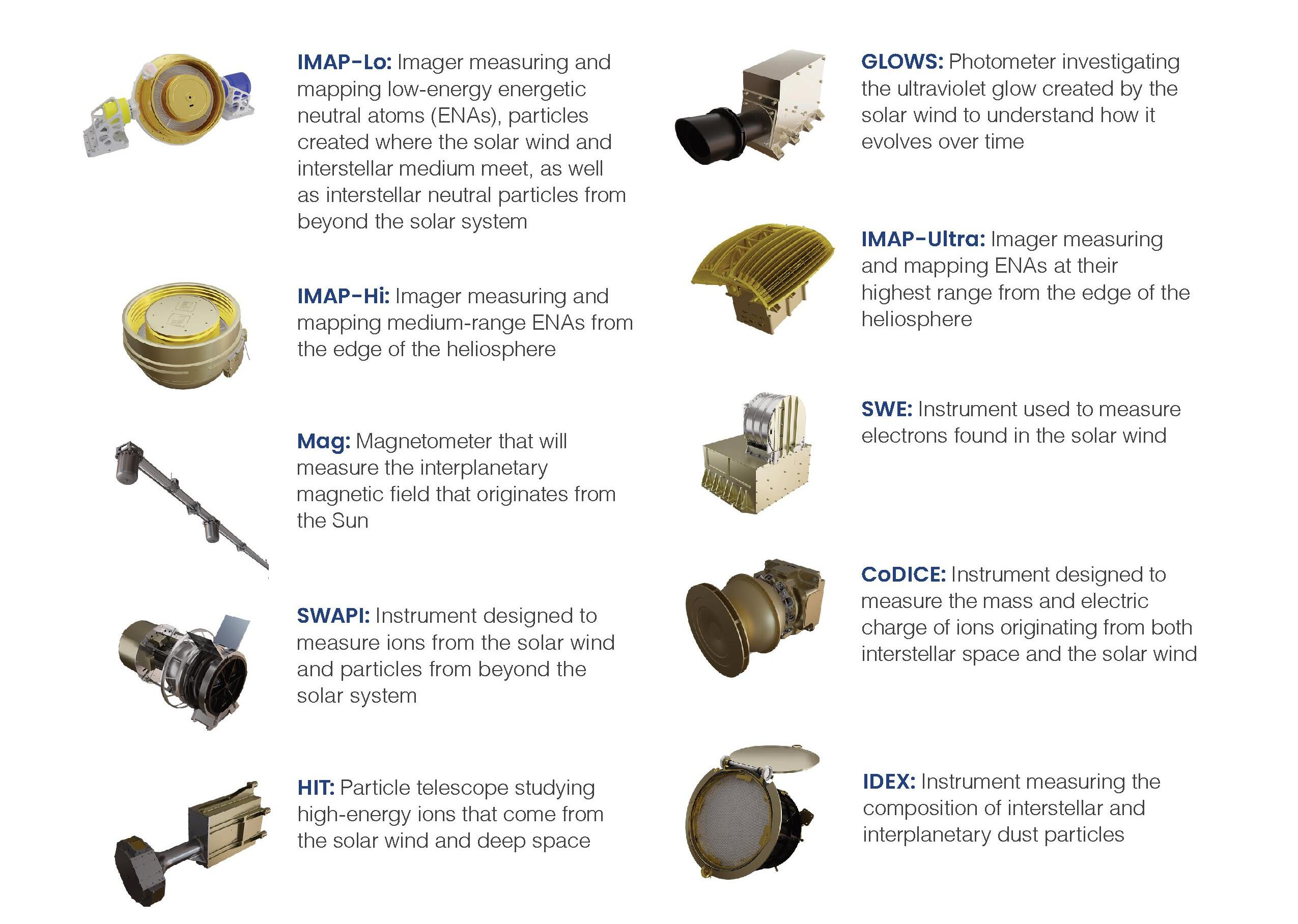
IMAP instruments

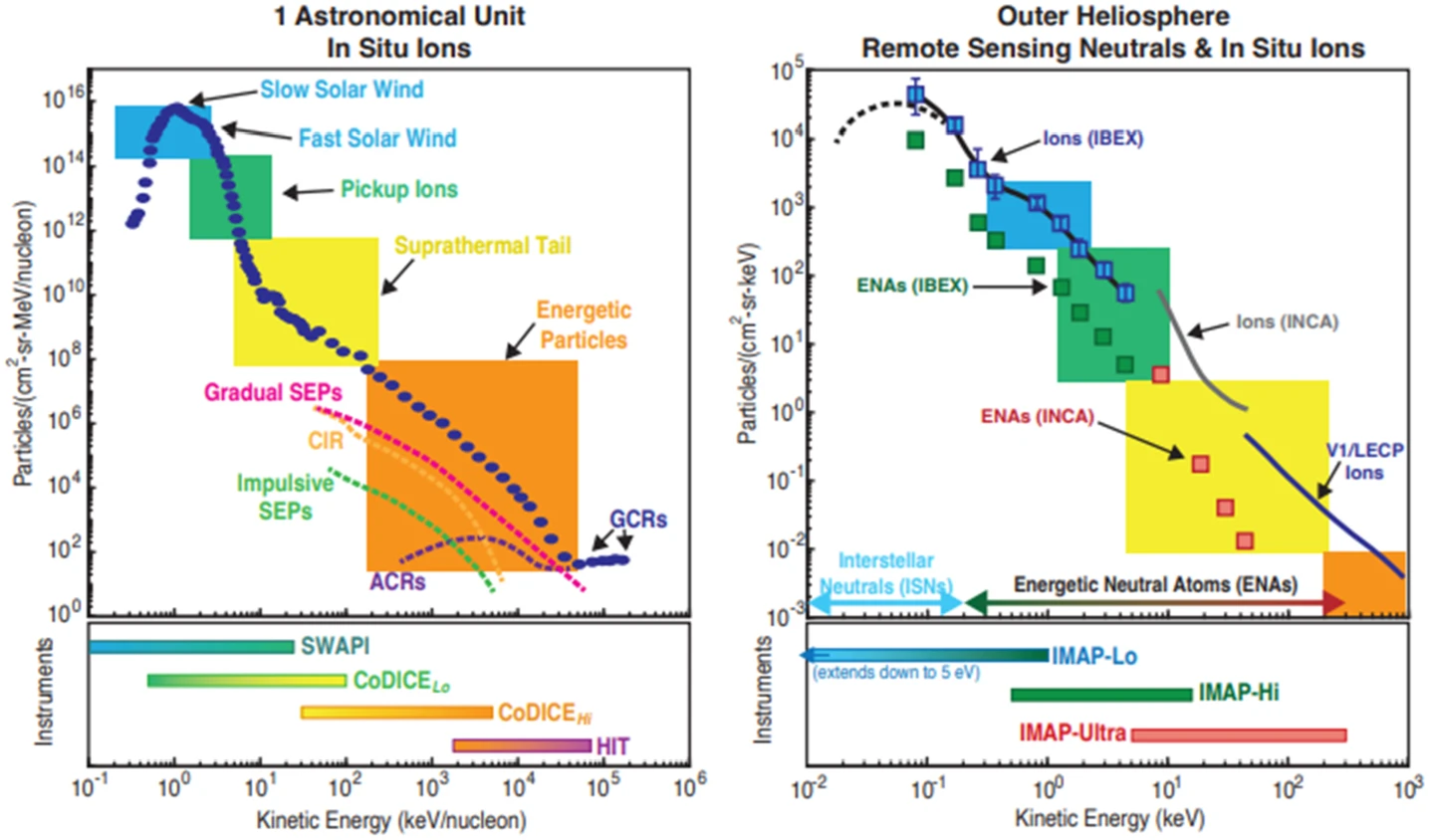
Particle energy spectra for ions at 1 AU and energetic neutral atoms and the corresponding particle populations and IMAP instrument ranges.

The ten instruments on IMAP can be grouped into three categories: 1) Energetic neutral atom (ENA) detectors (IMAP-Lo, IMAP-Hi, and IMAP-Ultra); 2) Charged particle detectors (SWAPI, SWE, CoDICE, and HIT); and 3) Other coordinated measurements (MAG, IDEX, GLOWS).

Shown here on the left are oxygen fluences measured at 1 AU by several instruments onboard Advanced Composition Explorer (ACE) during a 3-year period, with representative particle spectra obtained for gradual and impulsive Solar Energetic Particles (SEPs), corotating interaction regions (CIRs), anomalous cosmic rays (ACRs), and galactic cosmic rays (GCRs). The overlapping energy ranges for the various IMAP ion instrument measurements are indicated across the bottom. On the right, the panel shows characteristic energy distributions but for ENAs coming in from the heliosheath and VLISM; with the bottom also showing the overlapping energy ranges for the IMAP ENA instrument measurements and interstellar neutrals. Ion fluxes are from Voyager 1, along its particular trajectory and ENA Observations are from Cassini and IBEX for the same direction. Figure is adapted from McComas et al. 2018.

==== IMAP-Lo ====
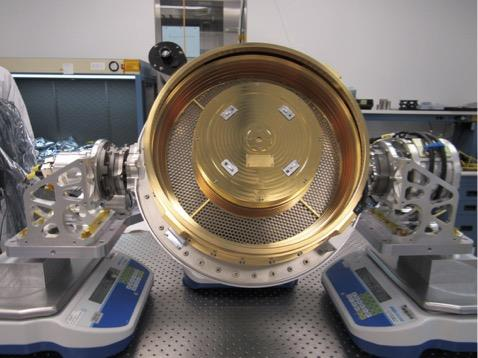
The IMAP-Lo instrument and electronics box for the Interstellar Mapping and Acceleration Probe (IMAP) undergo inrush testing in the Electromagnetic Interference and Compatibility test facility.

IMAP-Lo is a single-pixel neutral atom imager, mounted on a pivot platform, that gives energy and angle-resolved measurements of ISN atoms (H, He, O, Ne, and D) tracked over >180° in ecliptic longitude and energy resolved global maps of ENA H and O. IMAP-Lo has heritage from the IBEX-Lo on IBEX but provides much larger collection power.

==== IMAP-Hi ====
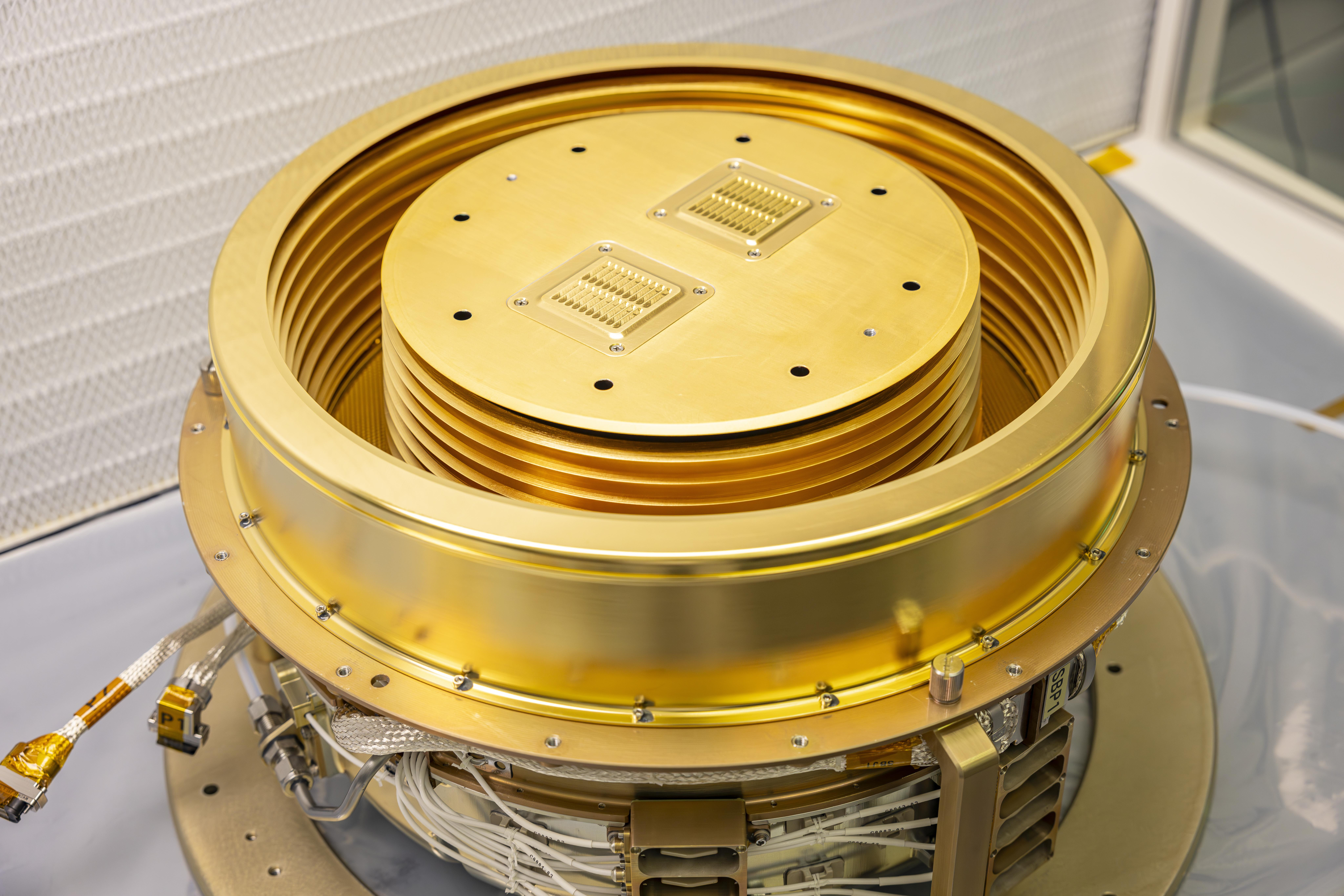
The IMAP-Hi 45 instrument is shown before installation onto the Interstellar Mapping and Acceleration Probe (IMAP) at the Johns Hopkins Applied Physics Laboratory (APL) in Laurel, Maryland.

IMAP-Hi consists of two identical, single-pixel high energy ENA Imagers that measure H, He, and heavier ENAs from the outer heliosphere. Each IMAP-Hi Imager is very similar in design to the IBEX-Hi ENA Imager but incorporate key modifications that enable substantially improved resolution, spectral range, and collection power. The instrument also incorporates a time-of-flight (TOF) system for identification of ENA species.

==== IMAP-Ultra ====
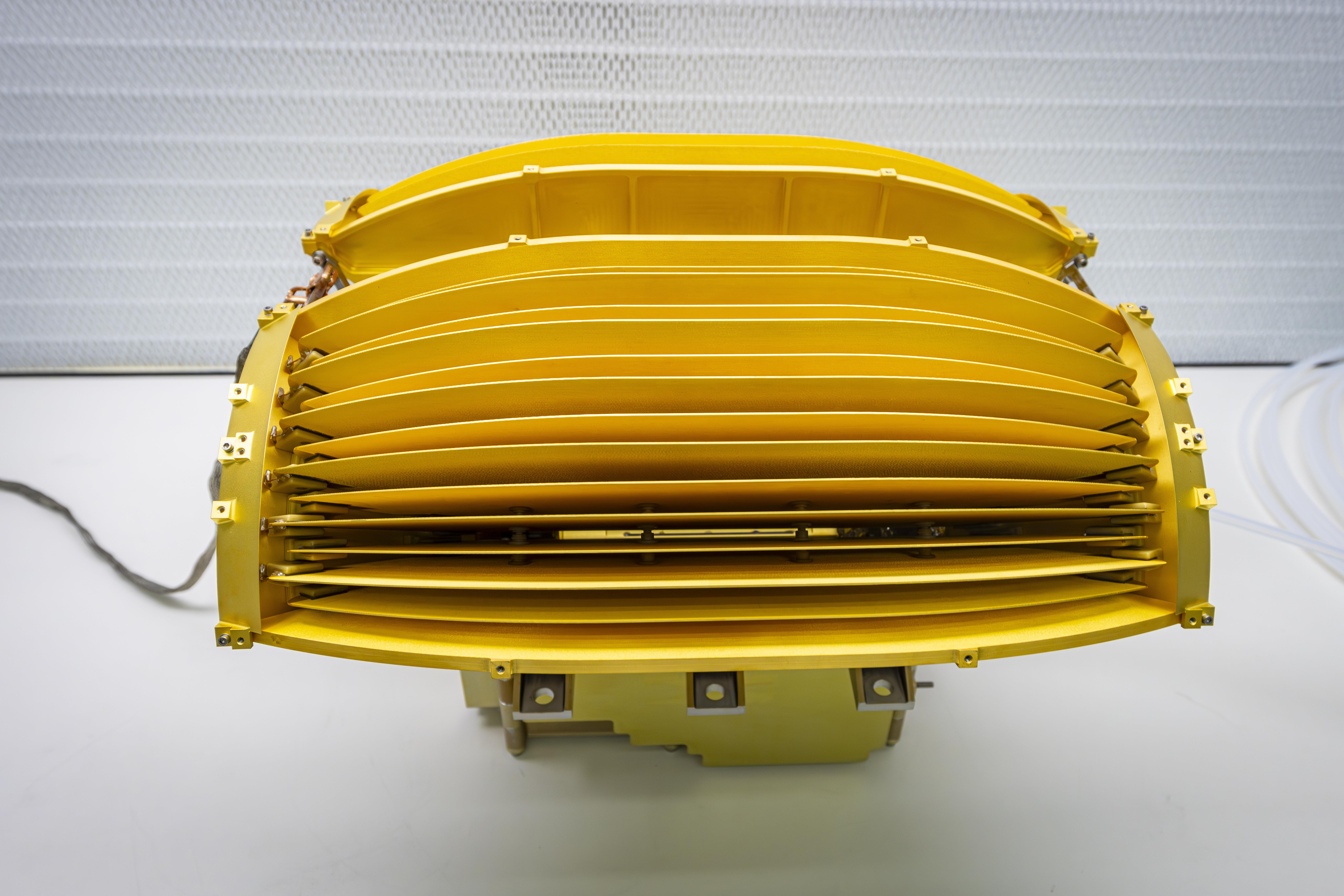
The IMAP-Ultra 45 instrument before it’s installed to the Interstellar Mapping and Acceleration Probe (IMAP) at the Johns Hopkins Applied Physics Laboratory in Laurel, Maryland.

The IMAP-Ultra instrument images the emission of ENAs produced in the heliosheath and beyond, primarily in H atoms between ~3 and 300 keV, but it is also sensitive to contributions from He and O. Ultra is nearly identical to the Jupiter Energetic Neutral Imager (JENI), in development for flight on the European Space Agency's Jupiter Icy Moon Explorer (JUICE) mission to Jupiter and Ganymede. Ultra's primary differences from JENI are the use of two identical copies, one mounted perpendicular to the IMAP spin axis (Ultra90) and one mounted at 45° from the anti-sunward spin axis (Ultra45) for better sky coverage, and the use of slightly thicker, UV-filtering foils covering the back plane MCPs to reduce backgrounds associated with interstellar Lyman-α photons.

==== Solar Wind and Pick-up Ion (SWAPI) ====
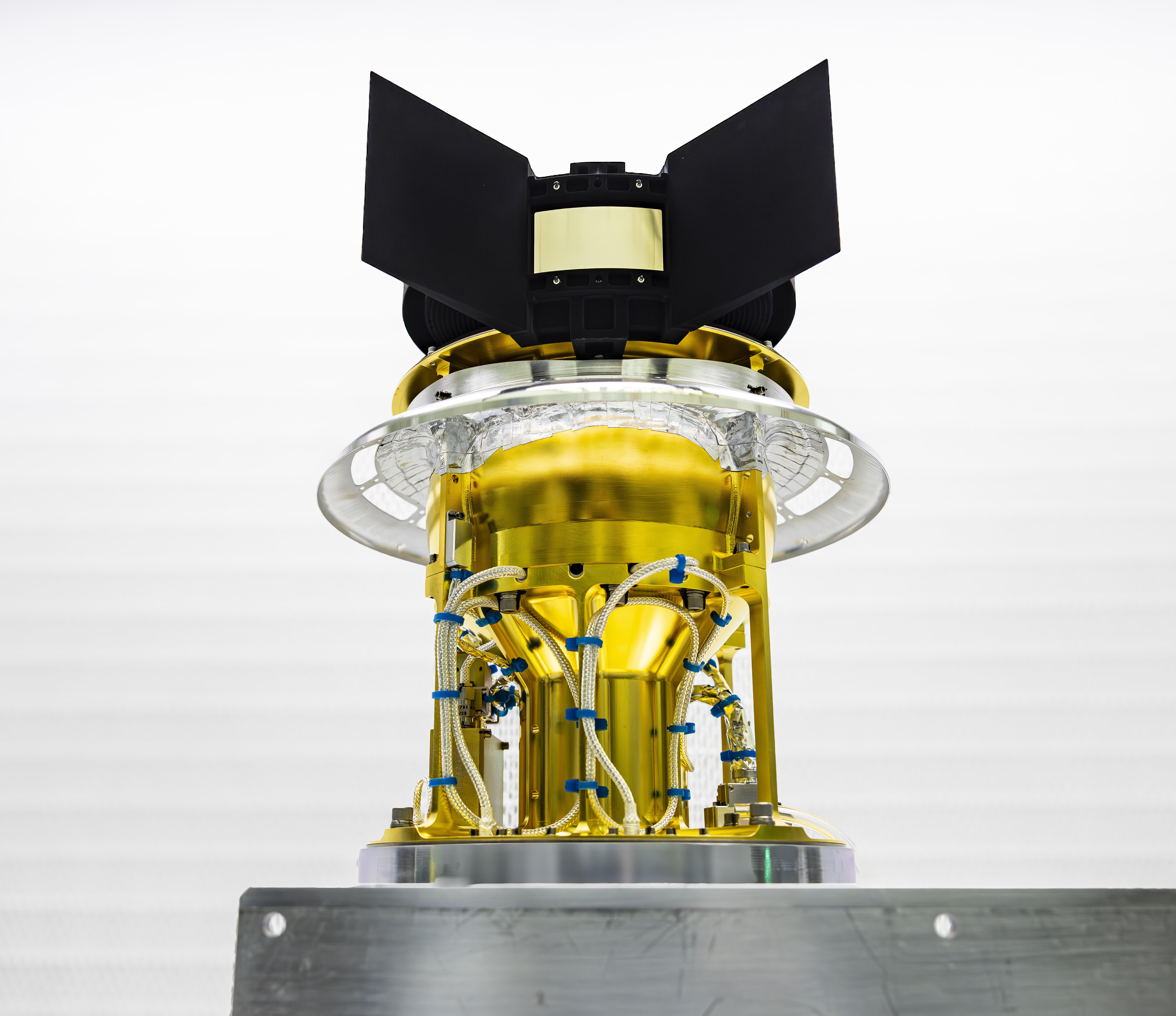
The Solar Wind and Pickup Ion (SWAPI) instrument is shown before installation onto the Interstellar Mapping and Acceleration Probe (IMAP) at the Johns Hopkins Applied Physics Laboratory in Laurel, Maryland.

The Solar Wind and Pickup Ion (SWAPI) instrument measures solar wind H^{+} and He^{++} and interstellar He^{+} and H^{+} pickup ions (PUIs). SWAPI is nearly identical to the New Horizons Solar Wind Around Pluto (SWAP) instrument. SWAPI is a simplification of SWAP, and by removal of SWAP's retarding potential analyzer, significantly increases transmission and improves sensitivity, further enhancing PUI observations.

==== Solar Wind Electron (SWE) ====
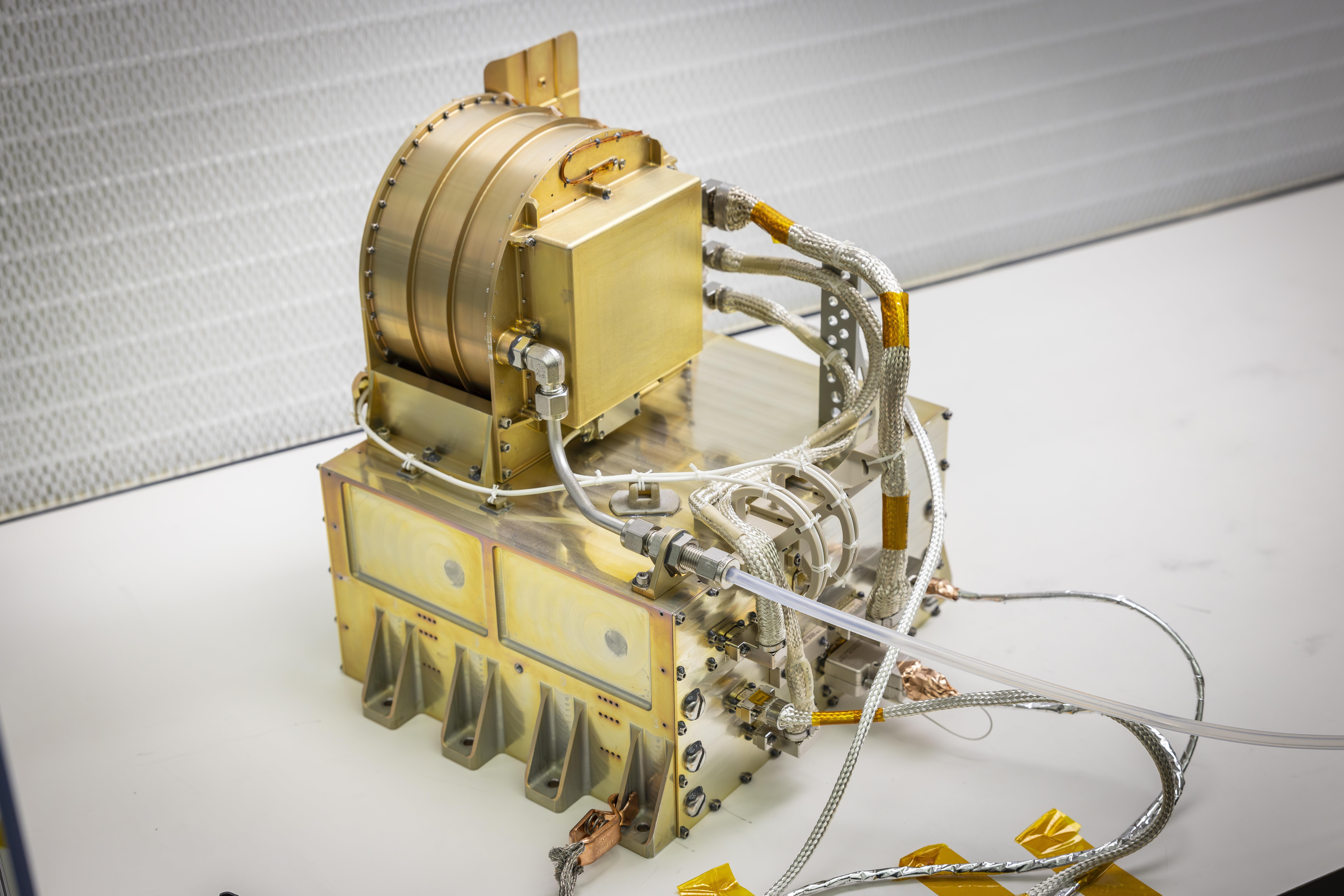
The Solar Wind Electron (SWE) instrument before installation to the Interstellar Mapping and Acceleration Probe (IMAP) spacecraft at the Johns Hopkins Applied Physics Laboratory in Laurel, Maryland.

The Solar Wind Electron (SWE) instrument measures the 3D distribution of solar wind thermal and suprathermal electrons from 1 eV to 5 keV. SWE is based on the heritage Ulysses / SWOOPS, ACE/SWEPAM and Genesis/GEM instruments, with updated electronics based on Van Allen Probes/HOPE. SWE is optimized to measure in situ solar wind electrons at L1 to provide context for the ENA measurements and perform the in situ solar wind observations necessary to understand the local structures that can affect acceleration and transport.

==== Compact Dual Ion Composition Experiment (CoDICE) ====
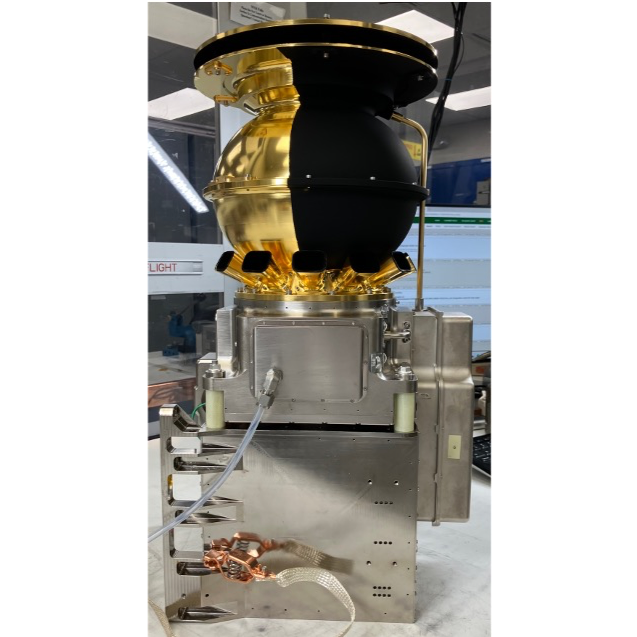
The CoDICE flight model in testing chamber at Southwest Research Institute (SwRI).

The Compact Dual Ion Composition Experiment (CoDICE) measures charged particles in two separate energy ranges in a compact, combined instrument. CoDICELo is an electrostatic analyzer with a time-of-flight versus energy (TOF/E) subsystem to measure the 3D velocity distribution functions (VDFs) and ionic charge state and mass composition of ~0.5–80 keV/q ions. CoDICEHi uses the common TOF/E subsystem to measure the mass composition and arrival direction of ~0.03–5 MeV/nuc ions and ~20–600 keV electrons.

==== High-energy Ion Telescope (HIT) ====
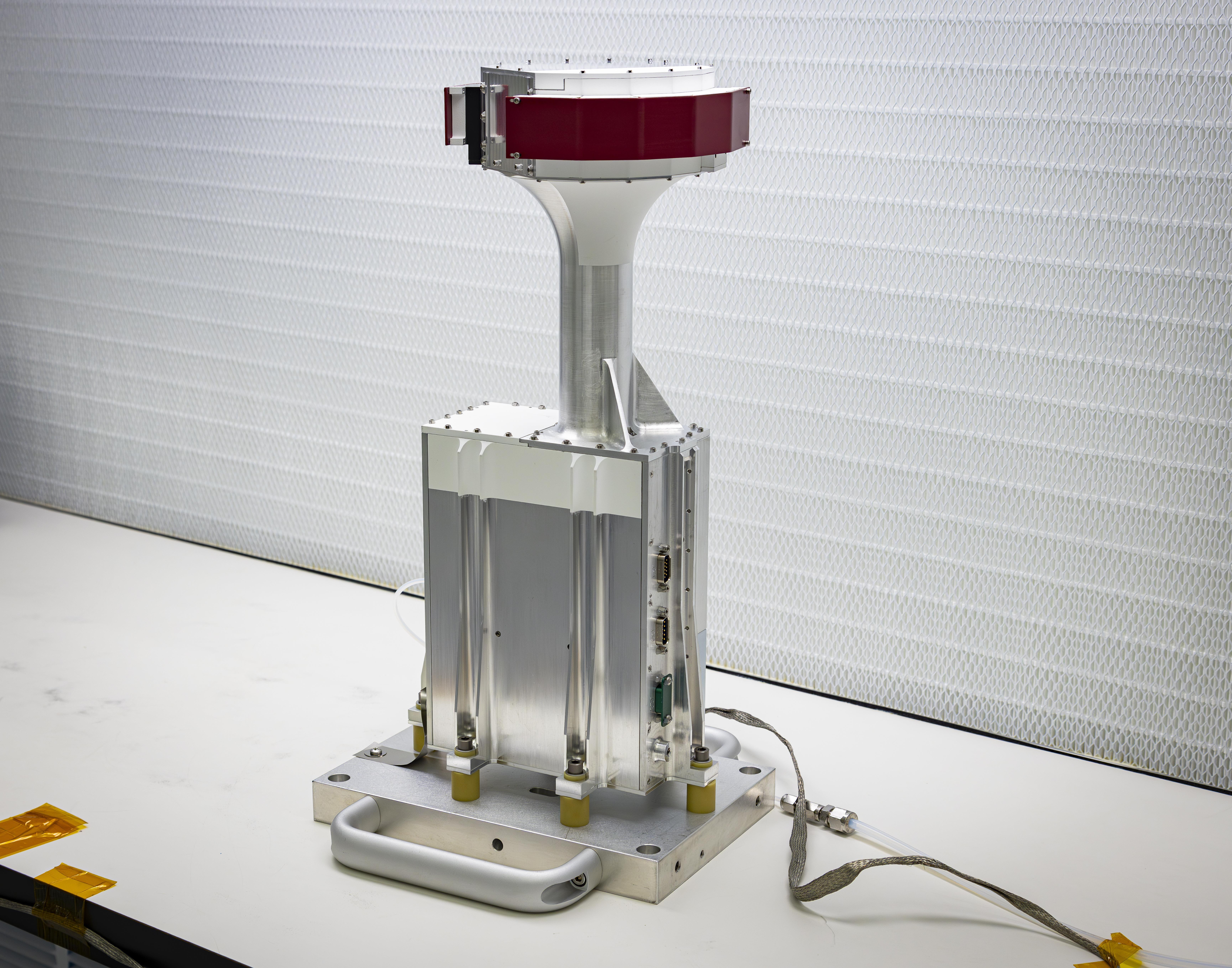
The High-energy Ion Telescope (HIT) instrument sits in the flow bench of the cleanroom as it awaits installation onto the Interstellar Mapping and Acceleration Probe at the Johns Hopkins Applied Physics Laboratory in Laurel, Maryland.

The High-energy Ion Telescope (HIT) uses silicon solid-state detectors to measure the elemental composition, energy spectra, angular distributions, and arrival times of H to Ni ions over a species-dependent energy range from ~2 to ~40 MeV/nuc. HIT, heavily based on the Low Energy Telescope (LET) on the Solar Terrestrial Relations Observatory (STEREO), delivers full-sky coverage with a large geometry factor. A portion of the HIT viewing area is also optimized to measure 0.5 - 1.0 MeV electrons.

==== Magnetometer (MAG) ====
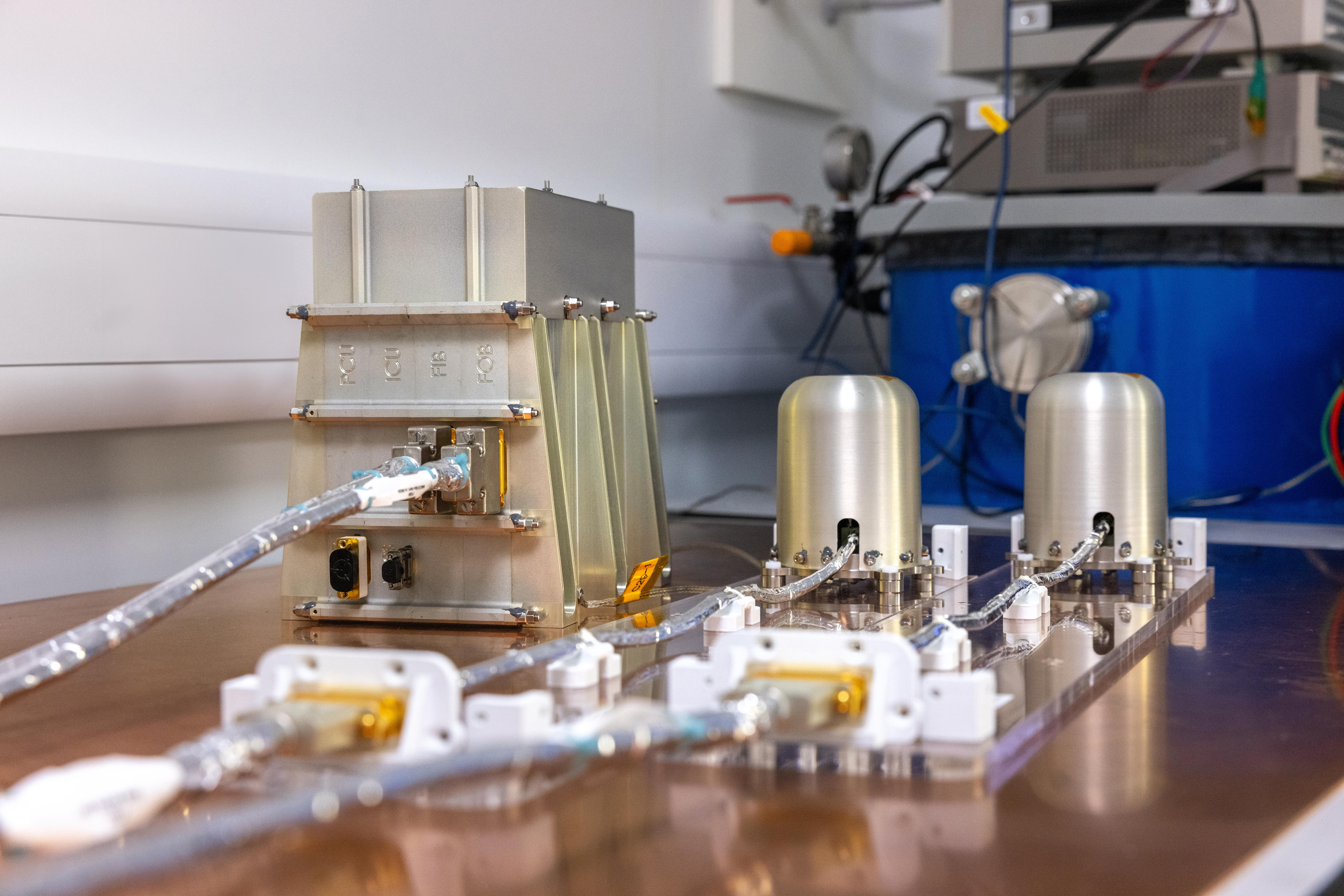
The MAG instrument flight model sensors prior to installation on the boom.

The IMAP magnetometer (MAG) consists of a pair of identical triaxial fluxgate magnetometers that measure the 3D interplanetary magnetic field. Both magnetometers are mounted on a 1.8 m boom, one on the end and the other in an intermediate position. This configuration, through gradiometry, reduces the effect of spacecraft magnetic fields on the measurements of the instrument by dynamically removing the spacecraft field. The MAG sensors are based on the Solar Orbiter mission magnetometers and are built by Imperial College London.

==== Interstellar Dust Experiment (IDEX) ====
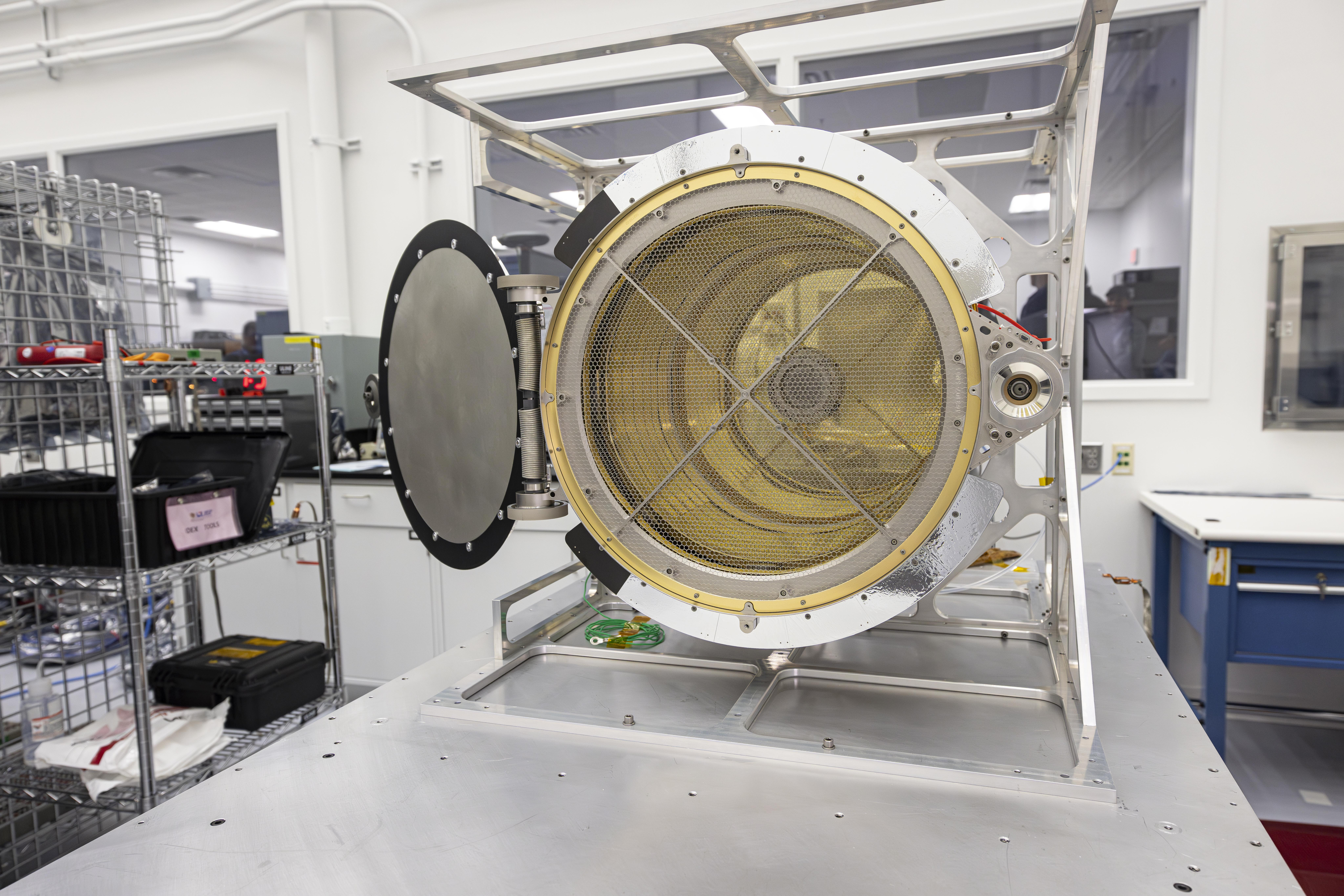
The Interstellar Dust Experiment (IDEX) instrument for IMAP is shown at the Johns Hopkins Applied Physics Laboratory in Laurel, Maryland.

The Interstellar Dust Experiment (IDEX) is a high-resolution dust analyzer that provides the elemental composition, speed and mass distributions of interstellar dust particles. IDEX's sensor head has a large effective target area (700 cm^{2} [110 sq in]), which allows it to collect a statistically significant number of dust impacts (> 100/year). This instrument was constructed at the Laboratory for Atmospheric and Space Physics (LASP) at the University of Colorado Boulder.

==== GLObal solar Wind Structure (GLOWS) ====
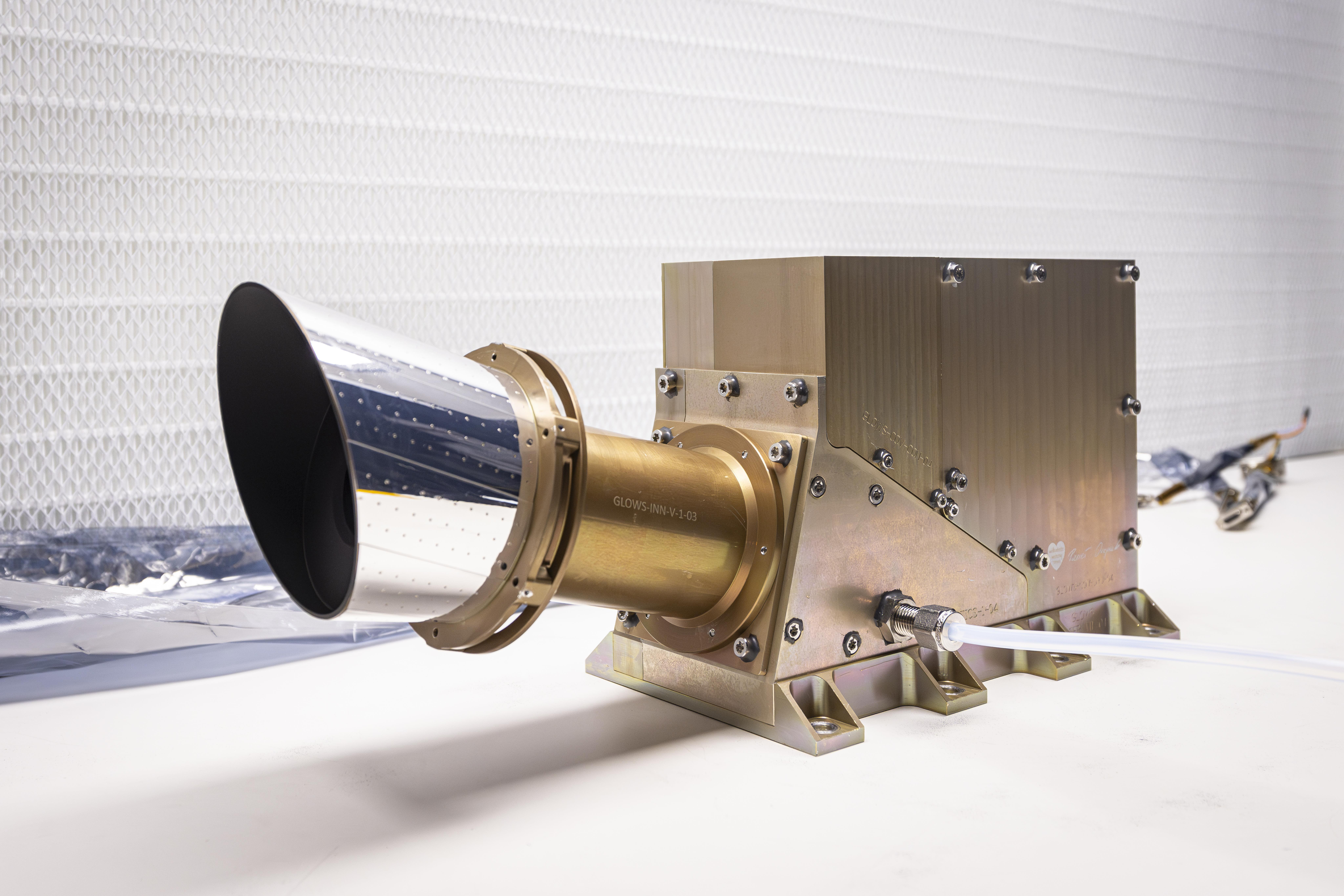
The GLObal Solar Wind Structure (GLOWS) instrument prior to installation onto the IMAP spacecraft at the Johns Hopkins Applied Physics Laboratory (APL) in Laurel, Maryland.

The GLObal Solar Wind Structure (GLOWS) is a non-imaging single-pixel Lyman-α photometer that observes the sky distribution of the helioglow to better understand the evolution of the solar wind structure. The helioglow is formed by the interaction between interstellar neutral hydrogen (ISN H) and solar photons in a specific ultraviolet region called the Lyman-α waveband.

Photons enter the detector through a collimator with a baffle that restricts the photons to those only from GLOWS’ field of view (FOV). A spectral filter allows only photons found in the Lyman-α wavelength band into a channel electron multiplier (CEM) detector that counts them. GLOWS’ FOV shifts with IMAP's daily spin axis redirection, allowing for sequential observations of the structure of the solar wind from separate locations around the Sun. The Lyman-α photon counts from these observations can be used to build a more comprehensive picture of the solar wind structure and how it changes through the solar cycles.

GLOWS design and assembly is led by the Space Research Center, Polish Academy of Sciences, Warsaw, Poland (CBK PAN).

=== Communications ===
Nominally, IMAP has two 4-hour contacts per week through the NASA Deep Space Network (DSN). This is sufficient to upload any commands, download the week's worth of science data and housekeeping, and perform spacecraft ranging required for navigation. DSN communicates with the IMAP Mission Operation Center (MOC) at Johns Hopkins University Applied Physics Laboratory, which operates the spacecraft. All science and ancillary data passes through the MOC to the Science Operations Center (SOC) at LASP. The IMAP Science and Mission Operations Team is responsible for all aspects of instrument operations: planning, commanding, health and status monitoring, anomaly response, and sustaining engineering for the instruments. The IMAP Science Data System handles science data processing (including data calibration, validation and preliminary analysis), distribution, and archiving. Science data are produced centrally using algorithms, software, and calibration data provided and managed by each instrument team. The IMAP Data Pipeline, including data management and access and algorithms for all IMAP instruments, is open source.

All science and other data are shared with the heliophysics community as rapidly as practical with an open data policy compliant with the NASA Heliophysics Science Data Management Policy. The NASA Space Physics Data Facility (SPDF) is the final archive for IMAP, with regular transfer of data to the SPDF so that the data can be made available through their Coordinated Data Analysis Web (CDAWeb) site.

=== Space weather data ===
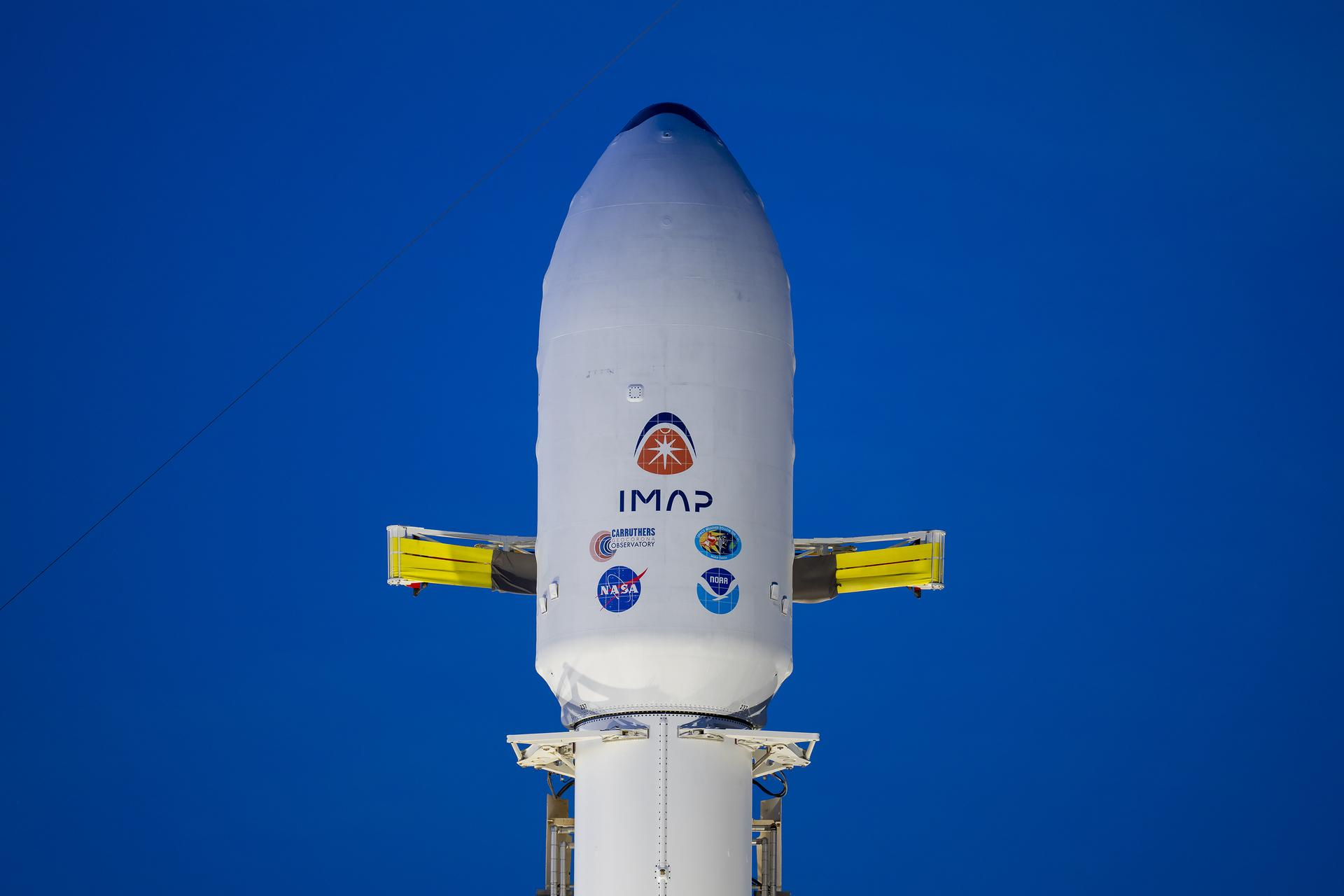
IMAP payload shortly before launch

IMAP supplies critical real-time space weather data through its "IMAP Active Link for Real-Time" or I-ALiRT. IMAP continuously broadcasts a small subset (500 bit/s) of the science data for I-ALiRT to supporting ground stations around the world when not in contact with the DSN. During DSN tracks, the flight system includes the space weather data in the full-rate science data stream, which the MOC receives from the DSN and forwards to the SOC. In either case, the SOC processes these real-time observations to create the data products required by the space weather community. Data include all of the important parameters currently provided by Advanced Composition Explorer (ACE), but at significantly higher cadence, and also include several new key parameters.

=== Management ===
This is the fifth mission in NASA's Solar Terrestrial Probes program. The Heliophysics Program Office at NASA's Goddard Space Flight Center in Greenbelt, Maryland, manages the STP program for the agency's Heliophysics Science Division in Washington, D.C.

The mission's principal investigator is David J. McComas of Princeton University.

The mission is cost-capped at US$564 million, excluding cost for the launch on a SpaceX Falcon 9 launch vehicle from Cape Canaveral Space Launch Complex 40 (SLC-40) at Cape Canaveral Space Force Station (CCSFS) in Florida. As of April 2020, the preliminary total cost of the mission is estimated to be US$707.7 million to US$776.3 million. The spacecraft was loaded with 144 kg (317 lb) of hydrazine fuel on 18 August 2025 in preparation for its launch.

== Missions of Opportunity ==
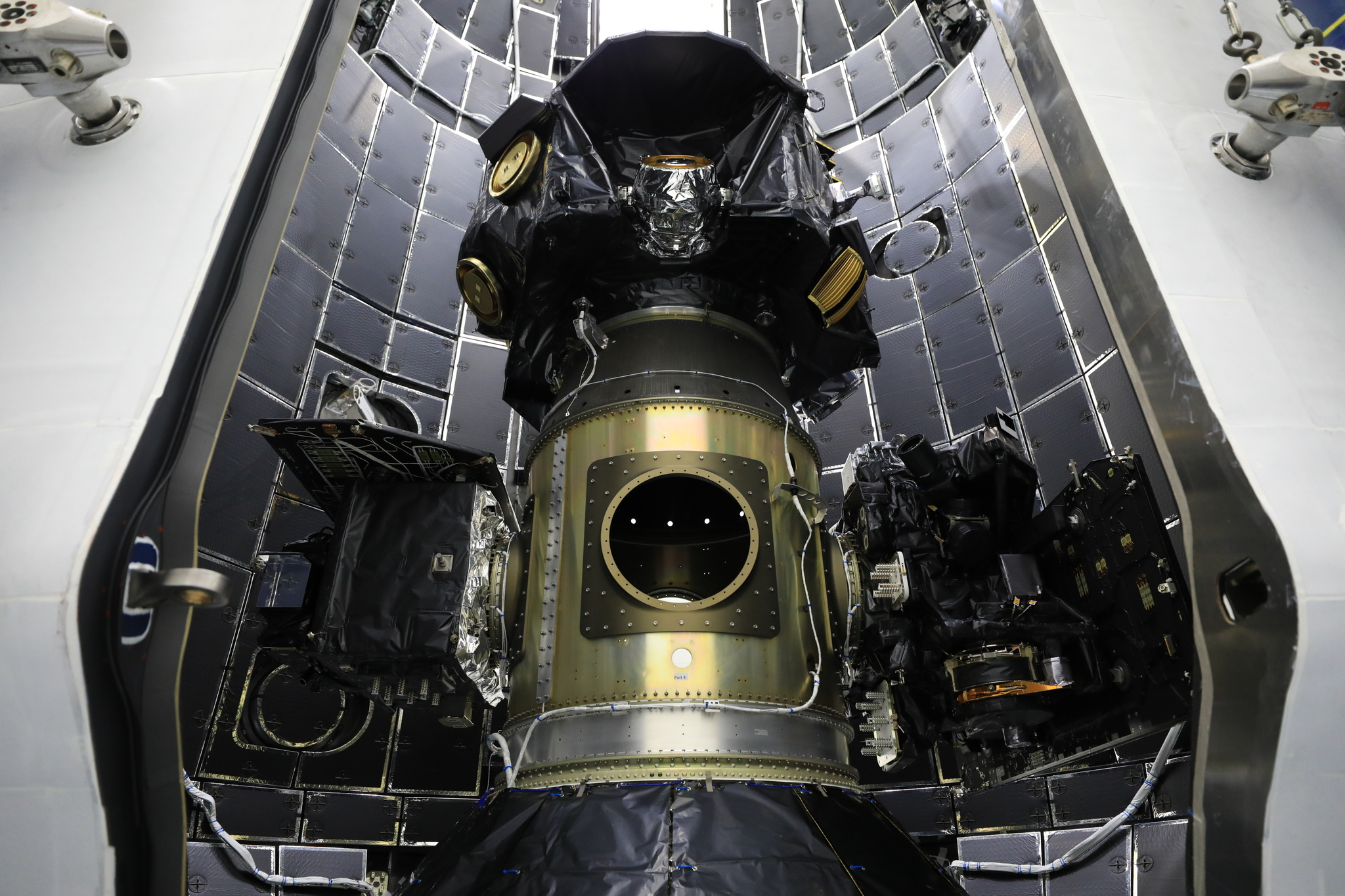
NOAA's SWFO-L1, along with NASA's Interstellar Mapping and Acceleration Probe (IMAP) and Carruthers Geocorona Observatory fully integrated for launch

NASA included an EELV Secondary Payload Adapter (ESPA) (Evolved expendable launch vehicle) Grande ring below the IMAP spacecraft, which gave the opportunity for multiple secondary payloads to ride along with the IMAP launch. Deployment of the secondary payloads would occur after IMAP deployment into a transfer orbit to the Earth-Sun L1 Lagrange point. Two opportunities for slots were competed for the Heliophysics Science Division as part of the Third Stand Alone Missions of Opportunity Notice (SALMON-3) Program Element Appendix (PEA). NOAA's SWFO-L1 and NASA's Carruthers Geocorona Observatory were launched as rideshares together with IMAP on 24 September 2025.

== See also ==
- Interstellar Boundary Explorer - The IBEX spacecraft, launched in October 2008
- Advanced Composition Explorer - The ACE spacecraft, launched in August 1997
- Voyager program - two Voyager spacecraft, launched in 1977
- Heliophysics Science Division - NASA science division in the Science Mission Directorate
- List of objects at Lagrange points
