= JEDI =

Radiometer and particle detector on the Juno spacecraft

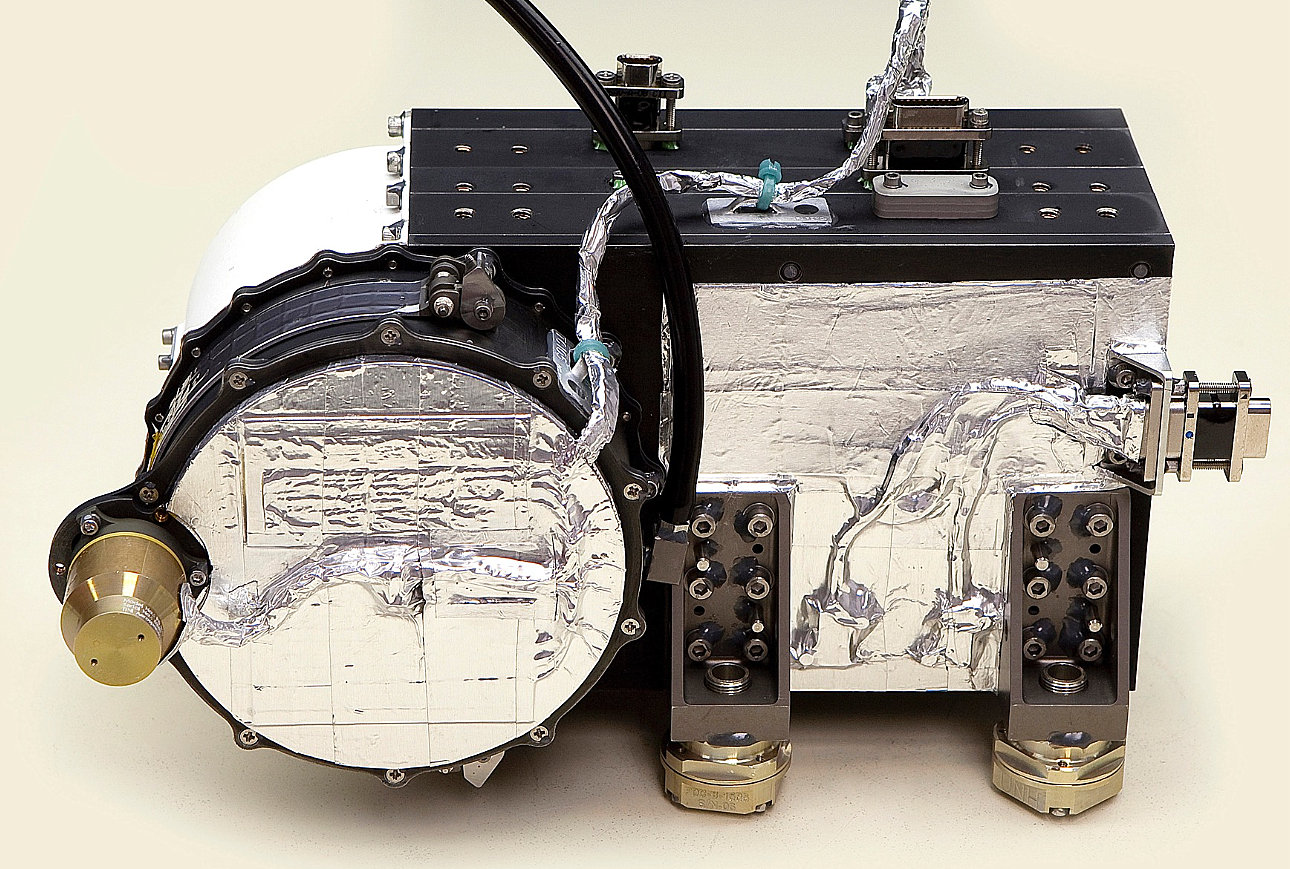
Juno's JEDI

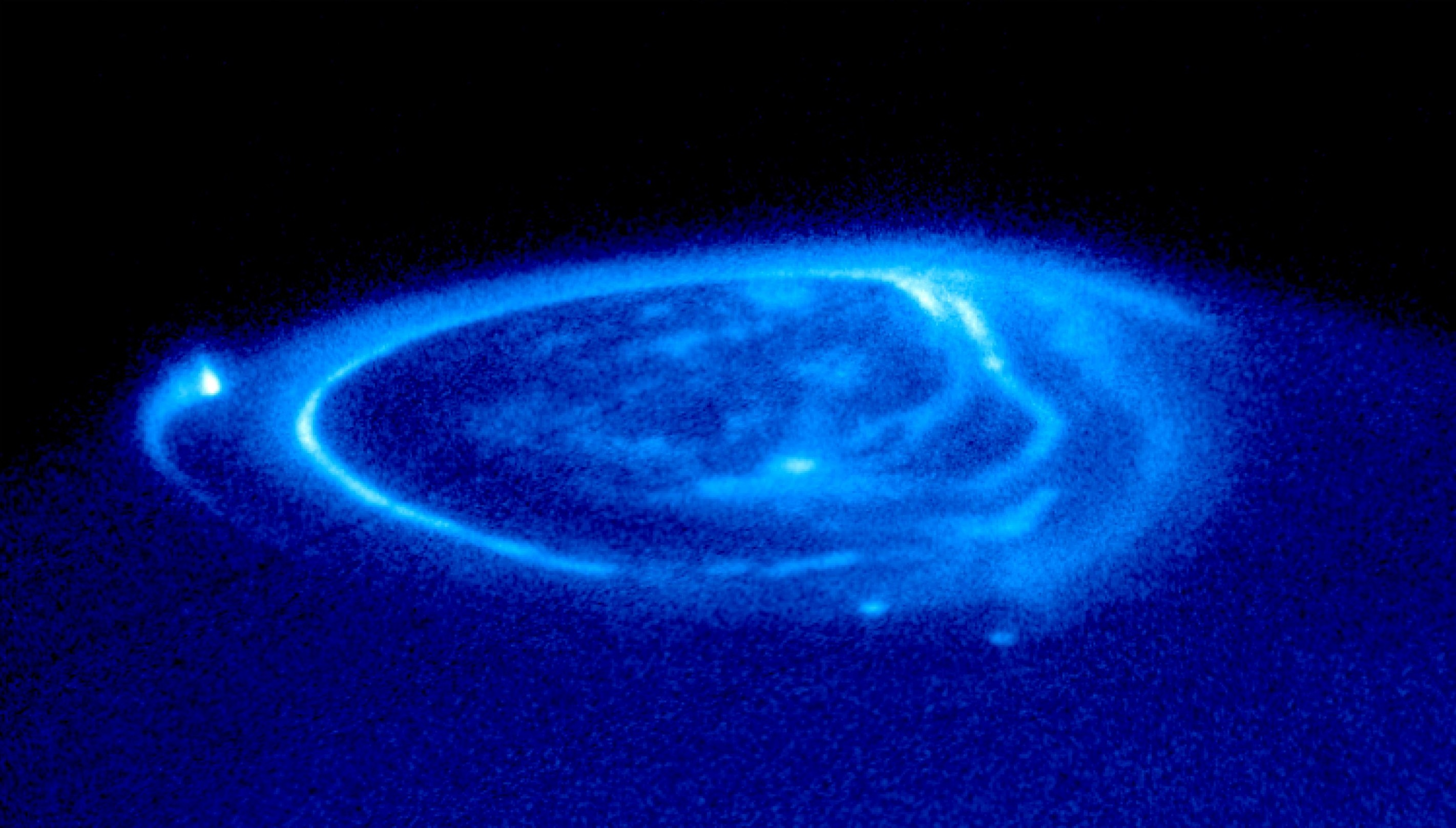
Jupiter aurora; the bright spot at far left is the end of field line to Io; spots at bottom lead to Ganymede and Europa

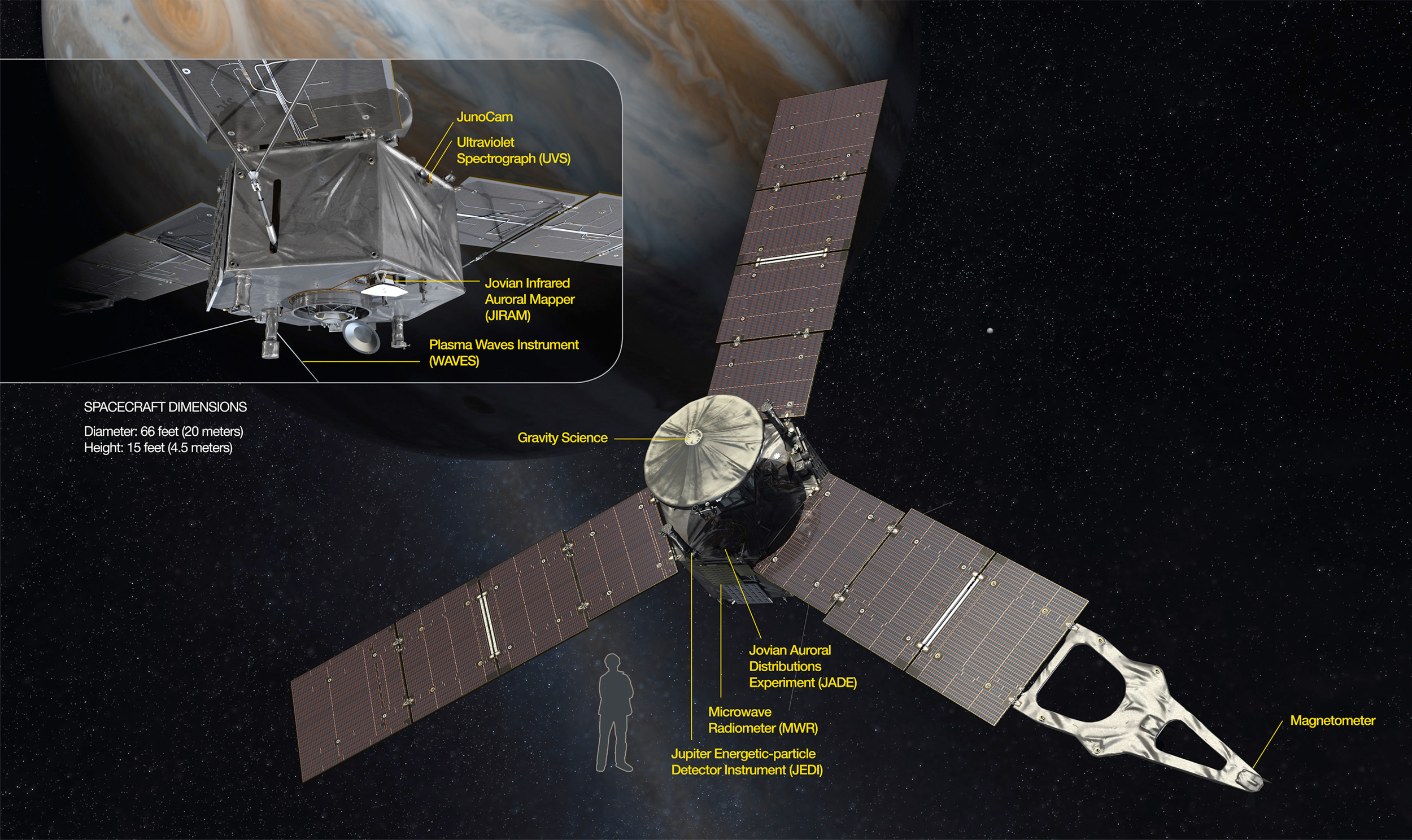
Artist generated diagram showing the location of various instruments

JEDI (Jupiter Energetic-particle Detector Instrument) is an instrument on the Juno spacecraft orbiting planet Jupiter. JEDI coordinates with the several other space physics instruments on the Juno spacecraft to characterize and understand the space environment of Jupiter's polar regions, and specifically to understand the generation of Jupiter's powerful aurora. It is part of a suite of instruments to study the magnetosphere of Jupiter. JEDI consists of three identical detectors that use microchannel plates and foil layers to detect the energy, angle, and types of ion within a certain range. It can detect electrons between 40 and 500 keV (Kilo electron-volts), and hydrogen and oxygen from a few tens of keV to less than 1000 keV (1 MeV). JEDI uses radiation-hardened Application Specific Integrated Circuits (ASIC)s. JEDI was turned on in January 2016 while still en route to Jupiter, to study interplanetary space. JEDI uses solid state detectors (SSDs) to measure the total energy (E) of both the ions and the electrons. The MCP anodes and the SSD arrays are configured to determine the directions of arrivals of the incoming charged particles. The instruments also use fast triple coincidence and optimum shielding to suppress penetrating background radiation and incoming UV foreground.

JEDI is designed to collect data on "energy, spectra, mass species (H, He, O, S), and angular distributions"; the plan is to study the energies and distribution of charged particles. It can detect them at between 30 keV and 1 GeV, whereas JADE, another instrument on the spacecraft, is designed to observe below 30 keV. One of the concepts being studied is how energy from Jupiter's rotation is being converted in its atmosphere and magnetosphere.

It is radiation-hardened to collect in situ data on the planet's auroral magnetic field lines, the equatorial magnetosphere, and the polar ionosphere. It was built by the Johns Hopkins University Applied Physics Laboratory (APL). One of the goals is to understand the aurorae, and how particles are accelerated to such high speeds. One of the mysteries of Jupiter is that X-rays are emitted from the poles, but do not seem to come from the auroral ring.

Each detector has a field of view of 120 degrees by 12 degrees, and they are together positioned to provide a 360-degree (a full circle) view of the sky along that axis. The Juno spacecraft travels very rapidly in the close vicinity of Jupiter (up to 50 km/s) and also spins very slowly (2 RPM).

JEDI can detected particles from 30 to 1000 keV including:

- Electrons
- Proton (hydrogen) ions
- Helium ions
- Sulfur ions
- Oxygen ions
- Energetic neutral atoms (ENA's)

In relation to other space missions, an instrument on the Earth-orbiting Van Allen Probes (launched 2012), called RBSPICE, is nearly identical to JEDI. This type of instrument is also similar to the PEPSSI instrument on New Horizons (Pluto/Kupiter probe).

JEDI, in combination with data from the Ultraviolet Spectrometer, detected electrical potentials of 400,000 electron volts (400 keV), 20–30 times higher than Earth, driving charged particles into the polar regions of Jupiter.

A scientific paper titled Juno observations of energetic charged particles over Jupiter's polar regions: Analysis of monodirectional and bidirectional electron beams included results from a close pass over Jupiter's poles in August 2016 for electrons (25–800 keV) and protons (10–1500 keV). The paper analyzed electron angular beams in the auroral regions.

== See also ==
- Gravity Science
- IS☉IS (energetic particle detector on Parker Solar Probe)
- Jovian Auroral Distributions Experiment (JADE)
- Jovian Infrared Auroral Mapper (JIRAM)
- JunoCam (Visible-light camera on Juno orbiter)
- Magnetometer (Juno) (MAG)
- Microwave Radiometer (Juno)
- Pluto Energetic Particle Spectrometer Science Investigation
- SWAP (New Horizons), measures the Solar Wind on the New Horizons mission to Pluto and beyond
- SWEAP (measures ions and electrons on the Parker Solar Probe)
- UVS (Juno)
- Waves (Juno) (Radio and Plasma wave instrument)
