= Pickup ion =

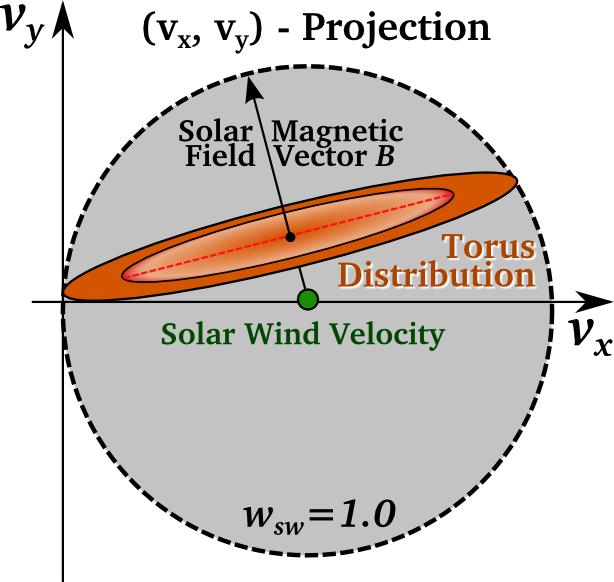
Illustration of the pickup ion velocity distribution function shortly after the ionization.

In solar physics, heliospheric pickup ions are created when neutral particles inside the heliosphere are ionized by either solar ultraviolet radiation, charge exchange with solar wind protons or electron impact ionization. Pickup ions are generally characterized by their single charge state, a typical velocity that ranges between 0 km/s and twice the solar wind velocity (~800 km/s), a composition that reflects their neutral seed population and their spatial distribution in the heliosphere. In the interplanetary medium, the neutral seed population of these ions can either be of interstellar origin or of lunar-, cometary, or inner-source origin. Just after the ionization, the singly charged ions are "picked up" by the magnetized solar wind plasma, hence their name, and develop strong anisotropic and toroidal velocity distribution functions, which gradually transform into a more isotropic state. After their creation, pickup ions move with the solar wind radially outwards from the Sun.

In space physics, pickup ions can be found around planets with an extended exosphere, such as Mars, Venus and Mercury, moons of the giant planets such as Io and Enceladus, or around active comets. These pickup ions are formed way upstream of the object and give rise to local plasma instabilities. At comets, the newly-born slow heavy ions, mostly water, oxygen and carbon dioxide ions, are progressively incorporated into the solar wind flow, resulting in a process called mass loading, as the impinging fast and light solar wind is eventually slowed down and deflected around the cometary nucleus.

Interstellar pickup ions originate from the neutral component of the Local Interstellar Medium (LISM), which enters the heliosphere with a velocity of 25 km/s as a result of its relative motion with respect to the Sun. This neutral wind is gradually ionized and acts as the seed population for interstellar pickup ions. Inner-source pickup ions are produced by an inner-source of neutral particles. The detailed production mechanisms for these ions are currently under debate.

== History ==
=== Interstellar pickup ions ===
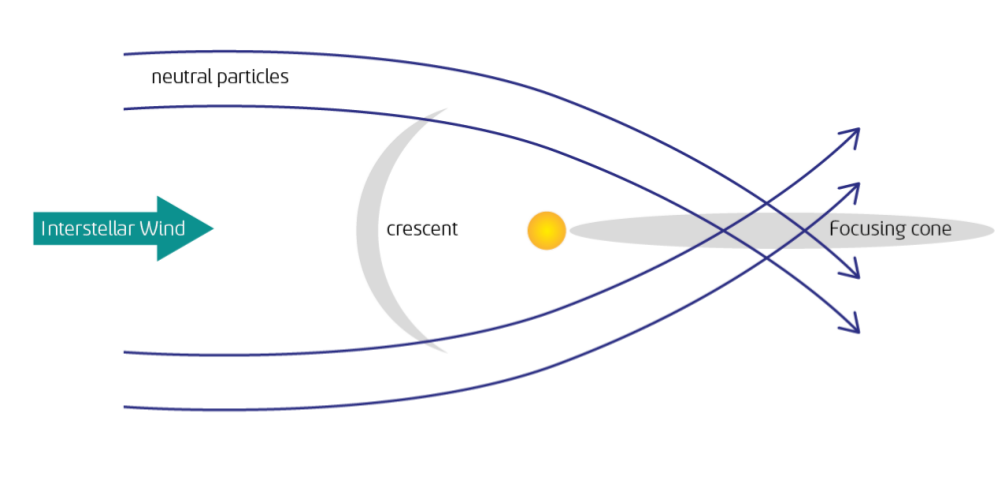
Illustration of the pickup ion focusing cone and crescent around the Sun.

Because the Sun is moving relative to the local interstellar medium with a velocity of ~25 km/s, interstellar atoms can enter the heliosphere without being deflected by the interplanetary magnetic field. The existence of a population of neutral interstellar particles inside the heliosphere was first predicted in 1970. Their journey from the outer edge of our heliosphere, the so-called heliopause, up to the orbit of Earth takes over 30 years to complete. During that time the interstellar atoms are gradually depleted by ionization processes and their density at 1 AU is significantly lower compared to the interstellar medium. Because atoms have different sensitivities for the various ionization processes, the composition of interstellar atoms at 1 AU is very different from the composition at the edge of our heliosphere or the local interstellar medium. Helium atoms have a very high first ionization potential compared to other interstellar species and are therefore less sensitive to ionization losses by solar UV ionization. This is also the reason why He^{+} is the most abundant interstellar pickup ion at 1 AU (followed by H^{+}, O^{+}, Ne^{+}, and N^{+}) and was also the first pickup ion to be detected using the SULEICA instrument on the AMPTE spacecraft in 1984. Consequent detections of H^{+}, O^{+}, Ne^{+}, and N^{+} have been made several years later with the SWICS instrument on board the Ulysses spacecraft.

The observations of interstellar pickup ions close to Earth allow to investigate the gas dynamics of the local interstellar medium, which otherwise can only be inferred remotely via optical observations or by a direct measurement of the interstellar neutral gas. The relative velocity of the local interstellar medium with respect to the Sun, temperature and density can be inferred from the spatial pattern of the observed pickup ion fluxes. In particular the pickup ion focusing cone, which is an enhancement of interstellar pickup ions that is co-aligned with the velocity vector of the interstellar neutral atoms (He^{+} and Ne^{+}), forms due to the Sun's gravitational attraction and can be used to infer the inflow direction of the local interstellar medium. Opposite to the focusing cone, on the so-called upwind side of the Sun, an enhanced pickup ion flux in the form of a crescent is produced for atoms with low first ionization potentials (H^{+}, O^{+}, N^{+}).

== See also ==
- Pluto Energetic Particle Spectrometer Science Investigation (measured pickup ions at Pluto in 2015, spacecraft instrument)
