= Integrated Science Investigation of the Sun =

Instrument on the Parker Solar Probe

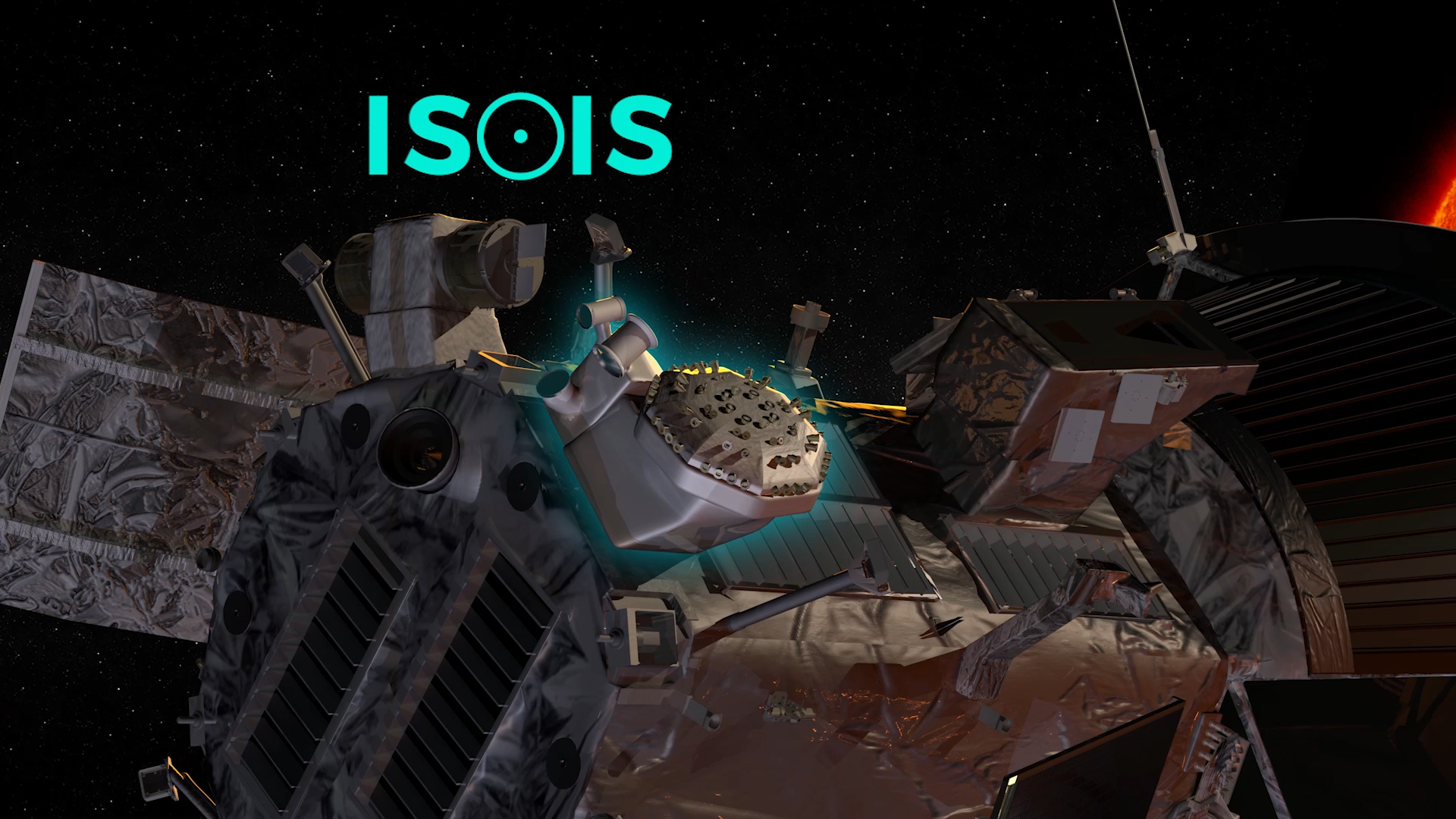
IS☉IS instrument location

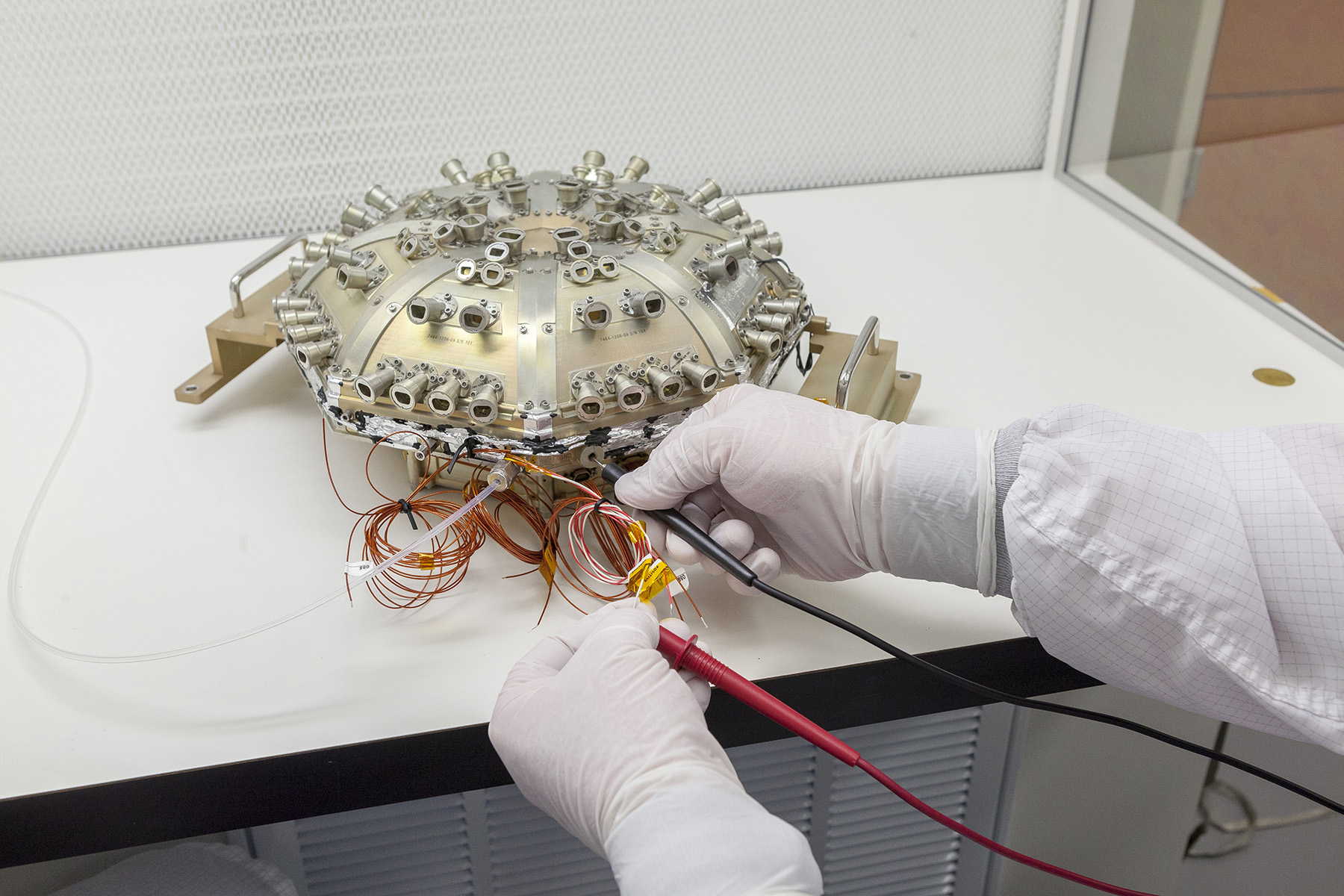
IS☉IS hardware being prepared for its mission, EPI-Lo hardware shown in 2017

Integrated Science Investigation of the Sun or IS☉IS, is an instrument aboard the Parker Solar Probe, a space probe designed to study the Sun. IS☉IS is focused on measuring energetic particles from the Sun, including electrons, protons, and ions. The parent spacecraft was launched in early August 2018, and with multiple flybys of Venus will study the heliosphere of the Sun from less than 4 million kilometers or less than 9 solar radii.

IS☉IS consists of two detectors, EPI-Lo and EPI-Hi, corresponding to detection of relatively lower and higher energy particles. EPI-Lo is designed to detect from about 20 keV per nucleon up to 15 MeV (mega electronvolts) total energy, and for electrons from about 25 keV up to 1000 keV. EPI-Hi is designed to measure charged particles from about 1– to 200 MeV per nucleon and electrons from about 0.5 to 6 MeV, according to a paper about the device.

The shortname includes a symbol for the Sun, a circle with a dot in it: ☉. NASA suggests pronouncing the name as /iːsɪs/ in English.

== Operations ==
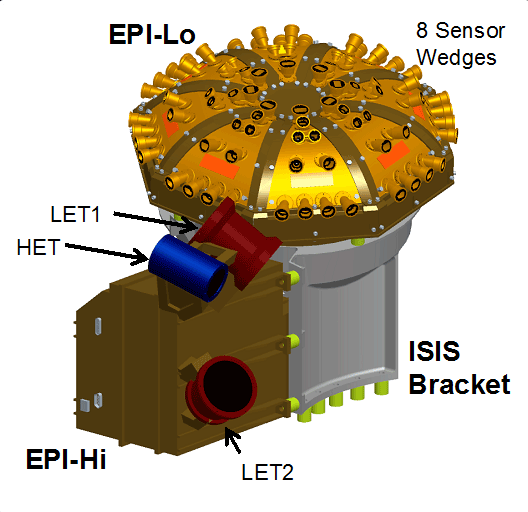
Labeled diagram of IS☉IS

By September 2018, IS☉IS had been turned on and first light data was returned.

== EPI-Hi ==
EPI-Hi includes:

- High Energy Telescope (1)
  - HET has 16 detectors stacked
- Low Energy Telescopes (2)
  - LET1 is double ended with 9 stacked detectors
  - LET2 is single ended with 7 stacked detectors

The detectors are solid-state devices.

== EPI-Lo ==
EPI-Lo includes 8 wedge detectors, fed by 80 separate entrances. These entrances correspond to covering a field of view over almost a full hemisphere.

EPI-Lo can record differential energy spectra for electrons, Hydrogen, Helium-3, Helium-4, Carbon, Oxygen, Neon, Magnesium, Silicon, and Iron.

== See also ==
- JEDI (instrument on Juno Jupiter orbiter that detects energetic particles at Jupiter)
