= Solar Terrestrial Probes program =

Series of NASA missions

NASA's Solar Terrestrial Probes program (STP) is a series of missions focused on studying the Sun-Earth system. It is part of NASA's Heliophysics Science Division within the Science Mission Directorate.

== Objectives ==
- Understand the fundamental physical processes of the complex space environment throughout the Solar System, which includes the flow of energy and charged material, known as plasma, as well as a dynamic system of magnetic and electric fields.
- Understand how human society, technological systems, and the habitability of planets are affected by solar variability and planetary magnetic fields.
- Develop the capability to predict the extreme and dynamic conditions in space in order to maximize the safety and productivity of human and robotic explorers.

== Missions ==
=== TIMED ===
The TIMED (Thermosphere Ionosphere Mesosphere Energetics and Dynamics) is an orbiter mission dedicated to study the dynamics of the Mesosphere and Lower Thermosphere (MLT) portion of the Earth's atmosphere. The mission was launched from Vandenberg Air Force Base in California on December 7, 2001 aboard a Delta II rocket launch vehicle.

=== Hinode ===
Hinode, an ongoing collaboration with JAXA, is a mission to explore the magnetic fields of the Sun. It was launched on the final flight of the M-V-7 rocket from Uchinoura Space Center, Japan on September 22, 2006.

=== STEREO ===
STEREO (Solar Terrestrial Relations Observatory) is a solar observation mission. It consists in two nearly identical spacecraft, launched on October 26, 2006.

=== MMS ===
The Magnetospheric Multiscale Mission (MMS) is a mission to study the Earth's magnetosphere, using four identical spacecraft flying in a tetrahedral formation. The spacecraft were launched on March 13, 2015.

=== IMAP ===
IMAP (Interstellar Mapping and Acceleration Probe) is a heliosphere observation mission. Launched in September 2025, it will sample, analyze, and map particles streaming to Earth from the edges of interstellar space.
