= Ranger 5 =

Failed NASA lunar impactor (1962)

- Mission type: Lunar impactor
- Operator: NASA / JPL
- Harvard designation: 1962 Beta Eta 1
- COSPAR ID: 1962-055A
- SATCAT no.: 439
- Mission duration: 8 hours and 44 minutes

Spacecraft properties
- Manufacturer: Jet Propulsion Laboratory
- Launch mass: 342.46 kg
- Dimensions: 1.52 m × 2.51 m (5.0 ft × 8.2 ft)
- Power: 135 W

Start of mission
- Launch date: October 18, 1962, 16:59:00 UTC
- Rocket: Atlas LV-3 Agena-B 215D/AA7
- Launch site: Cape Canaveral LC-12

End of mission
- Last contact: October 19, 1962, 01:43:00 UTC

Orbital parameters
- Reference system: Heliocentric
- Eccentricity: 0.056
- Perihelion altitude: 0.9839 AU
- Aphelion altitude: 1.163 AU
- Inclination: 0.44°
- Period: 370.22 days

Lunar flyby (failed impact)
- Closest approach: October 21, 1962
- Distance: 724 kilometers (450 mi)
Instruments
- Television camera
- Gamma ray spectrometer
- Radar altimeter
- Seismometer

Ranger 5 was a spacecraft of the Ranger program designed to transmit pictures of the lunar surface to Earth stations during a period of 10 minutes of flight prior to impacting on the Moon, to rough-land a seismometer capsule on the Moon, to collect gamma-ray data in flight, to study radar reflectivity of the lunar surface, and to continue testing of the Ranger program for development of lunar and interplanetary spacecraft. Due to an unknown malfunction, the spacecraft ran out of power and ceased operation. It passed within 725 km of the Moon.

== Spacecraft design ==
Ranger 5 was a Block II Ranger spacecraft similar to Ranger 3 and Ranger 4. The basic vehicle was 3.1 m high and consisted of a lunar capsule covered with a balsawood impact-limiter, 65 cm in diameter, a mono-propellant mid-course motor, a retrorocket with a thrust of 5,080 lbf (22.6 kN), and a gold and chrome plated hexagonal base 1.5 m in diameter. A large high-gain dish antenna was attached to the base. Two wing-like solar panels (5.2 m across) were attached to the base and deployed early in the flight. Power was generated by 8680 solar cells contained in the solar panels which charged an 11.5 kg 1 kWh capacity AgZn launching and backup battery. Spacecraft control was provided by a solid-state digital computer and sequencer and an Earth-controlled command system. Attitude control was provided by six Sun and one Earth sensor, gyroscopes, and pitch and roll cold nitrogen gas jets. The telemetry system aboard the spacecraft consisted of two 960 MHz transmitters, one at 3 W power output and the other at 50 mW power output, the high-gain antenna, and an omnidirectional antenna. White paint, gold and chrome plating, and a silvered plastic sheet encasing the retrorocket furnished thermal control.

The experimental apparatus included: (1) a vidicon television camera, which employed a scan mechanism that yielded one complete frame in 10 s; (2) a gamma-ray spectrometer in a 300 mm sphere mounted on a 1.8 m boom; (3) a radar altimeter; and (4) a seismometer to be rough-landed on the lunar surface. The seismometer was encased in the lunar capsule along with an amplifier, a 50 mW transmitter, voltage control, a turnstile antenna, and six silver-cadmium batteries capable of operating the lunar capsule transmitter for 30 days, all designed to land on the Moon at 130 to 160 km/h (81 to 99 mph). The instrument package floated in a layer of freon within the balsawood sphere. The radar altimeter would be used for reflectivity studies, but was also designed to initiate capsule separation and ignite the retro-rocket.

== Mission ==
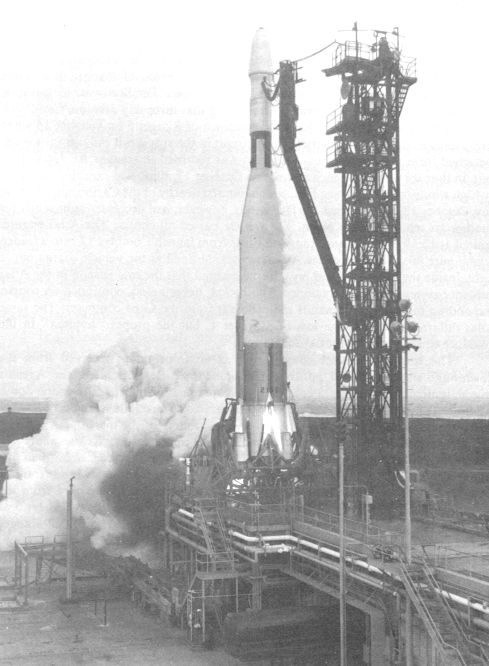
Ranger 5 lifted off from launch Complex 12

Ranger 5 was scheduled for launch in June 1962, but NASA instead decided to fly the Mariner Venus probes (derived from Block I Ranger) first which gave more time to work out problems with the spacecraft. After Mariner 1 ended its mission in the Atlantic Ocean instead of interplanetary space, the agency started coming under increased scrutiny from Congress due to its apparent inability to have any kind of success with planetary probes. Republican Congressman James Fulton confronted NASA Director of the Office of Programs J.J. Wyatt, noting that Mariner 1 had cost U.S. taxpayers $14 million and that there was no excuse at this point for failures every launch. As July 1962 ended, there had been 12 planetary probe attempts going back to 1958 and only two (Pioneer 4 and Pioneer 5) accomplished all of their mission goals. It might have been small consolation that Soviet planetary probe efforts during this time were little more successful, but all of their failures were kept secret, so the Soviets did not have to answer to their public about the waste of tax money on failed space missions.

The successful launch of Mariner 2 on August 27 momentarily blunted criticism of NASA and Jet Propulsion Laboratory and also seemed to verify the soundness of the Ranger design. Meanwhile, JPL engineers were still trying to figure out what had caused the computer failure on Ranger 4, which had occurred during a period when the probe was out of range of ground tracking. The malfunction was especially puzzling because the probe had been given very thorough ground testing without any anomalies occurring. Examination of telemetry records seemed to suggest that the failure had occurred during separation of Ranger 4 from the Agena, at the point where the electrical interface between the two was disconnected and Ranger 4 would have switched to internal power. The behavior of the probe indicated a transformer or inverter malfunction, probably a short circuit caused by loose metal coatings contacting the pins on the power umbilical attaching the probe to the Agena. Modifications to Ranger 5 included a backup timer to ensure continued operation of the telemetry system if the main computer failed, an additional nitrogen bottle to the attitude control system to reduce gas pressure, and an additional pyrotechnic igniter for the midcourse correction engine. Most importantly, extra diodes and fuses were added to the electrical lines to prevent another short from occurring.

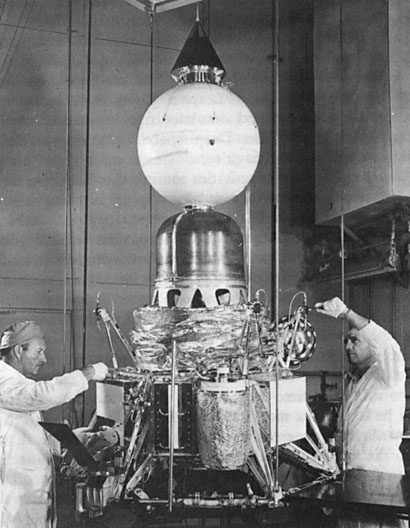
Ranger 5

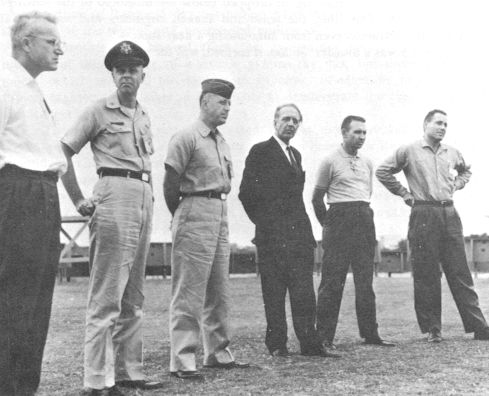
Ranger Program officials Assembled for the Ranger 5 Postlaunch Press Conference at Cape Canaveral. Left to Right: Friedrich Duerr, Major J. Mulladay, Lt. Col. Jack Albert, Kurt Debus, William Cunningham, and James Burke

Ranger 5 was heat-sterilized like Rangers 3-4 had been, so as to prevent unintended contamination of the Moon with Earth microbes. Rolf Halstrup, who was in charge of the sterilization program, had vocally objected to this procedure as he was convinced that subjecting the probes to a heat dosage was damaging the sensitive electronics in them. He convinced JPL in Pasadena management that sterilization of Ranger 4 had "very likely" damaged the main computer sequencer and timer and that the procedure needed to be stopped to ensure reliability of the spacecraft. Management agreed to stop sterilizing Ranger probes, but only on Ranger 8 and up, as Rangers 6-7 had already been sterilized.

On August 20, Ranger 5 began the long cross-country trip from state of California to Florida and arrived there the day of Mariner 2's launch. Atlas 215D and Agena 6005 arrived later that week and prelaunch checkouts were started. Initial preparations focused on the launch vehicle itself, which was causing almost as many problems as the Ranger probes themselves. The Atlas-Agena combination malfunctioned four out of the six times that NASA had launched it and every booster that was delivered to Cape Canaveral required modifications or repair work before it could fly. Moreover, in the year between Ranger 1 and Mariner 2, there had been no improvement whatsoever in the quality control of the Atlas-Agenas. Since Ranger launches had been delayed before by booster problems, technicians rushed to make sure nothing of the sort would delay Ranger 5's mission.

Tracking of Mariner 2 was an ongoing job during this time and since NASA's deep space tracking networks could not handle both probes at once, it was decided to switch attention to Ranger 5 for its short mission.

After two launch attempts were aborted, one due to an electrical short in the probe and the other due to weather concerns, the go to fly was given for October 18. Liftoff took place at 12:59 PM EST and the Atlas soon vanished into an overcast gray sky. A malfunction of the guidance system rate beacon at T+93 seconds resulted in noisy track rate data, but, unlike Ranger 3, discrete commands were received and issued by the guidance system properly. The Agena reached orbit successfully and began the burn to place Ranger 5 on a translunar trajectory.

Soon, however, high temperatures were detected in the computer system, and shortly afterwards, power generation from the solar panels ceased. The gamma ray detector was turned on, but the computer did not issue the command to align the spacecraft with Earth. Then the telemetry receivers at the tracking stations in Australia and South Africa malfunctioned, returning garbled data. It was obvious that an electrical short had disabled the solar panels, which meant that Ranger 5 now had only a few hours before it would run out of battery power. JPL technicians thought that they could still partially salvage the mission by firing the midcourse correction engine to ensure impact with the Moon, but they had to do it quickly before power ran out. Ground controllers sent commands to unfurl the high-gain antenna and align the probe for the midcourse burn, but during this time more electrical shorts apparently occurred because there was a momentary dropout from the telemetry transmitter. The midcourse engine was fired, but Ranger 5 exhausted its batteries halfway through the burn. The radio transponder and telemetry signals ceased, followed by uncontrolled tumbling of the probe. Ranger 5 passed 450 miles from the lunar surface en route to a permanent orbit around the Sun. Signals were still received from the tiny seismometer capsule until fading as the probe's distance from Earth became too great. Mission controllers tracked it to a distance of 1.3 million kilometres (810,000 mi).

This was the third attempt to impact the lunar surface with a Block II Ranger spacecraft. On this mission, just 15 minutes after normal operation, a malfunction led to the transfer of power from solar to battery power. Normal operation never resumed; battery power was depleted after 8 hours, and all spacecraft systems died. The first midcourse correction was never implemented, and Ranger 5 passed the Moon at a range of 724 kilometers on October 21 and entered heliocentric orbit. It was tracked to a distance of 1,271,381 kilometers. Before loss of signal, the spacecraft sent back about 4 hours of data from the gamma-ray experiment.

== See also ==
- Ranger program
- Timeline of Solar System exploration
- List of artificial objects on the Moon
