= Ranger 2 =

1961 unmanned US spacecraft

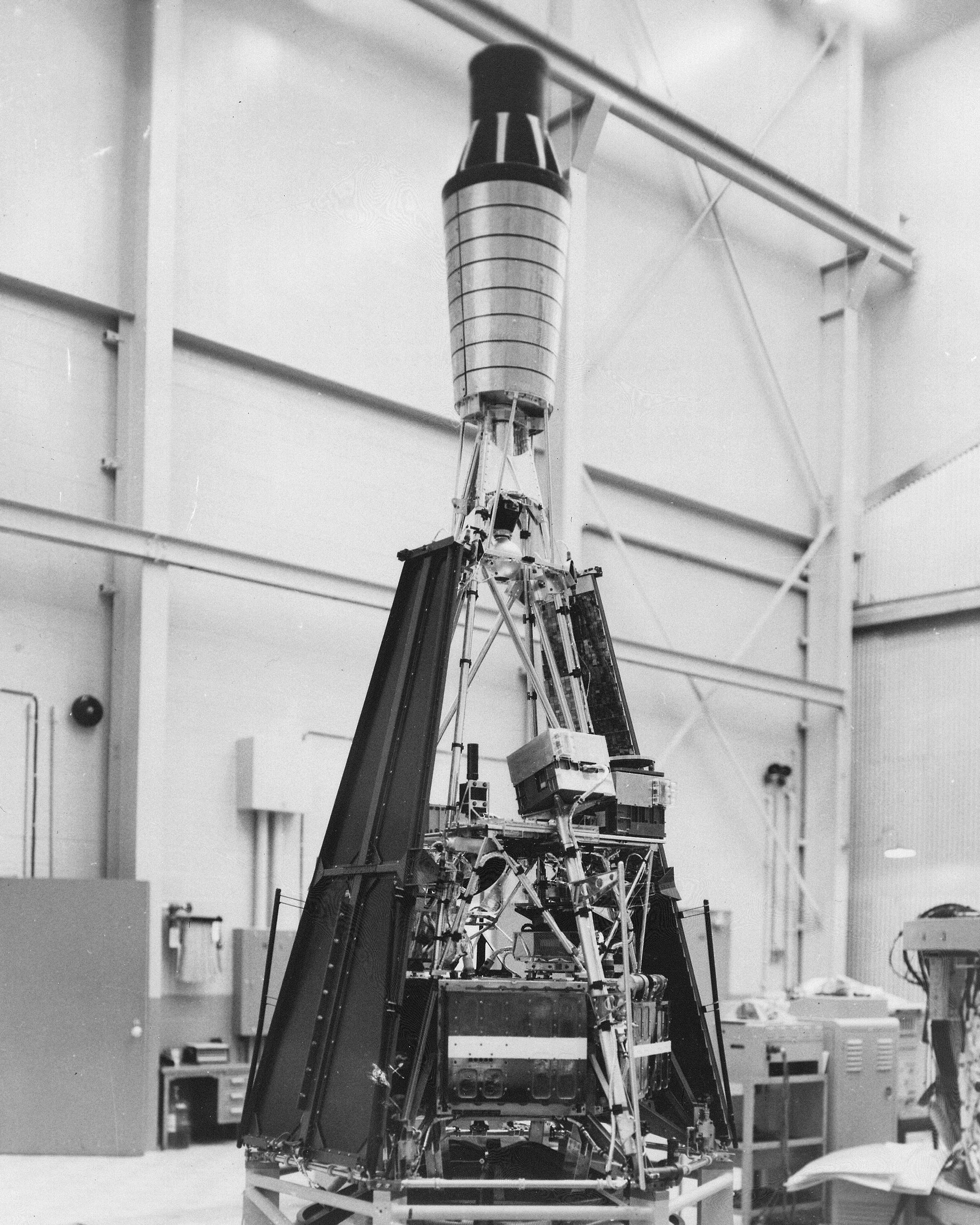
- Ranger 2
- Mission type: Technology
- Operator: NASA
- Harvard designation: 1961 Alpha Theta 1
- COSPAR ID: 1961-032A
- SATCAT no.: 206
- Mission duration: 2 days

Spacecraft properties
- Manufacturer: Jet Propulsion Laboratory
- Launch mass: 304 kilograms (670 lb)
- Power: 150 W

Start of mission
- Launch date: 18 November 1961, 08:09:00 UTC
- Rocket: Atlas LV-3 Agena-B
- Launch site: Cape Canaveral LC-12

End of mission
- Decay date: 20 November 1961

Orbital parameters
- Reference system: Geocentric
- Regime: Low Earth (High Earth planned)
- Semi-major axis: 6,574.2 kilometres (4,085.0 mi)
- Perigee altitude: 150 kilometres (93 mi)
- Apogee altitude: 242 kilometres (150 mi)
- Inclination: 33.3 degrees
- Period: ~89 minutes
Instruments
- Lyman-Alpha Telescope
- Rubidium Vapor Magnetometer
- Electrostatic Analyzer
- Medium Energy Particle Detectors
- Cosmic ray Ion Chamber
- Cosmic Dust Detectors
- X-ray Scintillantion Counters
- Triple Coincident Telescope

Ranger 2 was a flight test of the Ranger spacecraft system of the NASA Ranger program designed for future lunar and interplanetary missions. Ranger 2 was designed to test various systems for future exploration and to conduct scientific observations of cosmic rays, magnetic fields, radiation, dust particles, and a possible hydrogen gas "tail" trailing the Earth.

== Spacecraft design ==
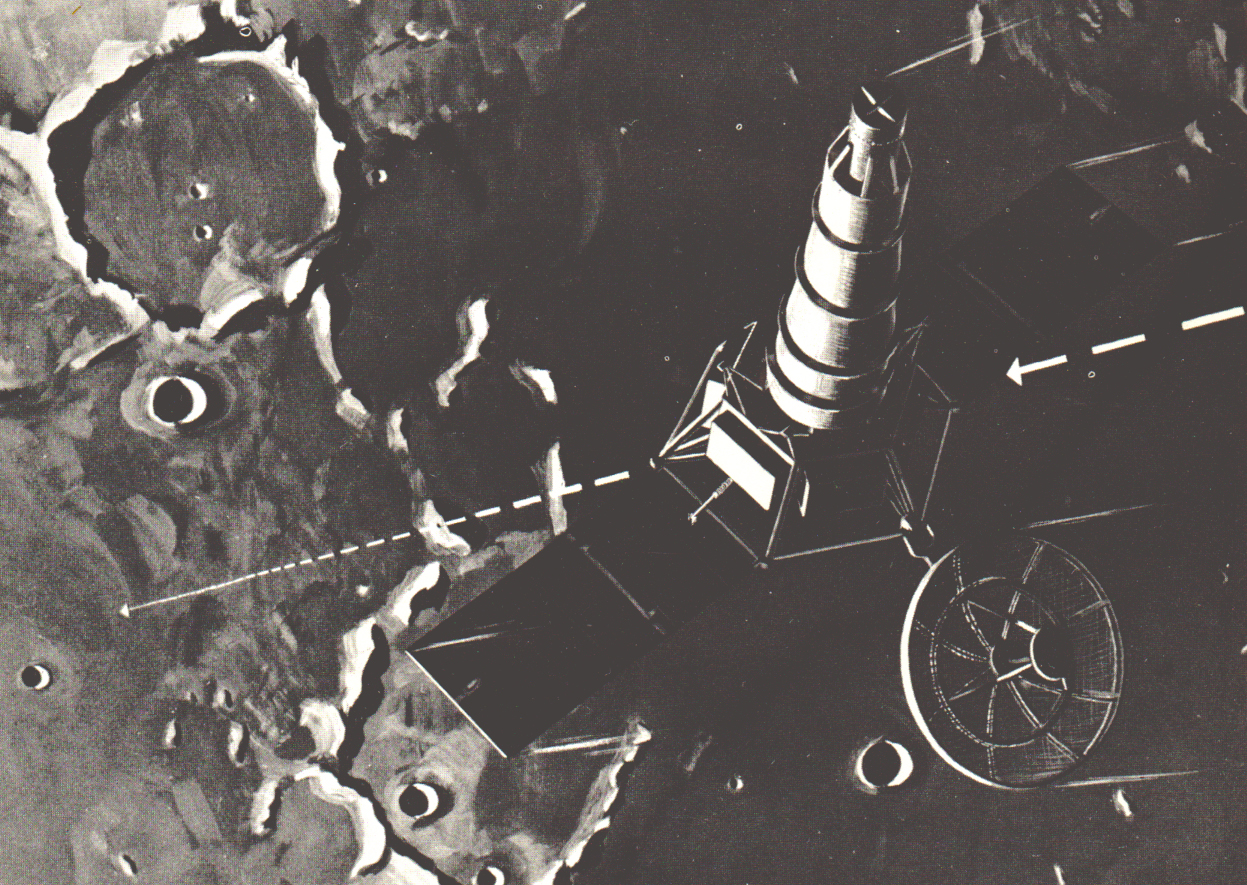
Artist's conception of Ranger 2 spacecraft.

Ranger 2 was of the Ranger Block 1 design and was almost identical to Ranger 1. The spacecraft consisted of a hexagonal base 1.5 metres (4 ft 11 in) across, upon which was mounted a cone-shaped 4-meter-high (13-foot) tower of aluminum struts and braces. Two solar panel wings measuring 5.2 metres (17 ft) from tip to tip extended from the base. A high-gain directional dish antenna was attached to the bottom of the base. Spacecraft experiments and other equipment were mounted on the base and tower. Instruments aboard the spacecraft included a Lyman-alpha telescope, a rubidium-vapor magnetometer, electrostatic analyzers, medium-energy-range particle detectors, two triple coincidence telescopes, a cosmic-ray integrating ionization chamber, cosmic dust detectors, and scintillation counters.

The communications system included the high-gain antenna and an omnidirectional medium-gain antenna and two transmitters at approximately 960 MHz, one with 0.25 W power output and the other with 3 W power output. Power was to be furnished by 8680 solar cells on the two panels, a 53.5 kilograms (118 lb) silver-zinc battery, and smaller batteries on some of the experiments. Attitude control was provided by a solid state timing controller, Sun and Earth sensors, gyroscopes, and pitch and roll jets. The temperature was controlled passively by gold plating, white paint, and polished aluminum surfaces.

== Mission ==
Shortly after Ranger 1's unsuccessful mission, Atlas 117D and Agena 6002 were rolled out to LC-12 for the next attempt. Once again, getting the booster and spacecraft ready for flight proved a frustrating experience. On October 24, NASA received the news from the West Coast of the United States that a hydraulics failure had prevented Discoverer 33 from reaching orbit the previous day, which necessitated taking Agena 6002 down from the stack and giving it a thorough checkout. The stage was found to have the same problem as Discoverer 33's Agena, necessitating repair work. It took until mid-November before everything was finally ready. Liftoff took place at 3:12 AM EST on November 18. An improper autopilot signal resulted in Atlas BECO taking place 0.4 seconds early. Thus the sustainer phase of flight was initiated with below nominal velocity, but the vehicle reached orbit successfully since the guidance computer was programmed to not issue the SECO command until the proper velocity was achieved. A similar event occurred on the launch of SAMOS 4 a few days later and was caused by the switch malfunctioning from its location on the side of the extremely cold LOX tank. The switch was moved to the fuel tank on subsequent Atlas-Agena vehicles.

An inoperative roll gyro caused loss of Agena roll control from the moment of staging. The first burn was performed successfully but the control gas was exhausted trying to keep the vehicle stable so when it came time for restart, the engine shut down after only one second of operation due to ingestion of control gas. Unlike with Ranger 1, the Agena had not operated long enough to achieve any significant ISP and so the probe was left in an even lower orbit. Tracking antennas could not lock onto the probe or send it any commands, nor could the attitude control system stabilize it. Telemetry and instrument data were still received for a few hours, but eventually the orbit decayed too low and after only one day and 19 orbits, Ranger 2 reentered the atmosphere and burned up. As a result of the failure, Agena vehicles would get a version of the Atlas's Spin Motor Rotation Detection System to ensure proper gyroscope operation at launch.

== See also ==
- Ranger program
- Timeline of Solar System exploration
- List of artificial objects on the Moon
