= Ranger 4 =

NASA lunar impactor (1962)

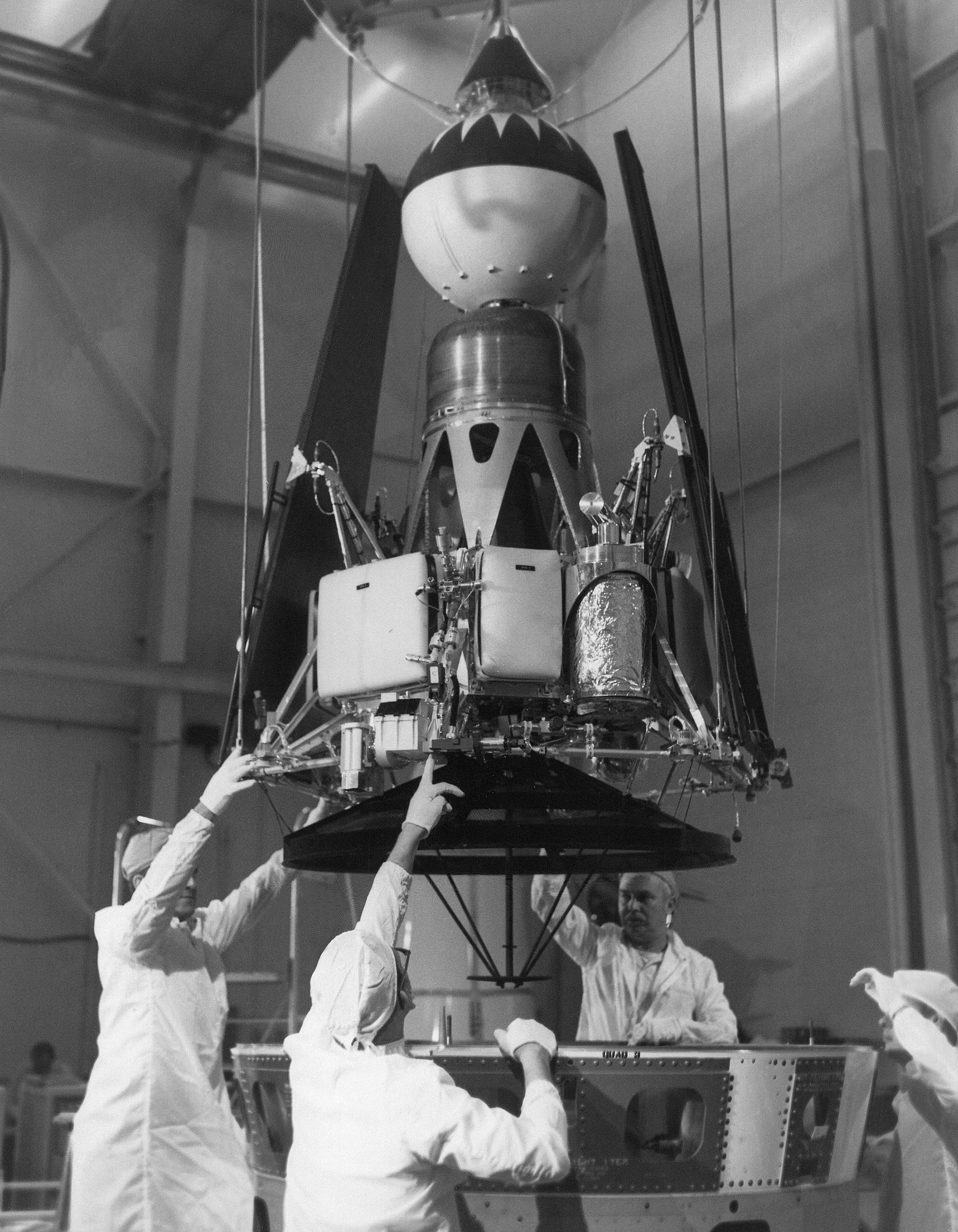
- Ranger 4
- Mission type: Lunar impactor
- Operator: NASA
- Harvard designation: 1962 Mu 1
- COSPAR ID: 1962-012A
- SATCAT no.: 280
- Mission duration: 10 hours (operational); 64 hours (to impact)

Spacecraft properties
- Manufacturer: Jet Propulsion Laboratory
- Launch mass: 331.1 kg (730 lb)
- Dimensions: 1.52 m × 2.51 m (5.0 ft × 8.2 ft)
- Power: 135 W

Start of mission
- Launch date: April 23, 1962, 20:50:00 UTC
- Rocket: Atlas LV-3 Agena-B
- Launch site: Cape Canaveral LC-12

Lunar impactor
- Impact date: April 26, 1962, 12:49:53 UTC; Failed before impact
- Impact site: 15.5°S 130.7°W
Instruments
- Television camera
- Gamma ray spectrometer
- Radar altimeter
- Seismometer

Ranger 4 was a spacecraft of the Ranger program, launched in 1962. It was designed to transmit pictures of the lunar surface to Earth stations during a period of 10 minutes of flight prior to crashing upon the Moon, to rough-land a seismometer capsule on the Moon, to collect gamma-ray data in flight, to study radar reflectivity of the lunar surface, and to continue testing of the Ranger program for development of lunar and interplanetary spacecraft.

An onboard computer failure caused failure of the deployment of the solar panels and navigation systems; as a result the spacecraft crashed on the far side of the Moon without returning any scientific data. It was the first spacecraft of the United States to reach another celestial body and the first of any nation to reach the surface of the far side of the Moon.

== Spacecraft design ==
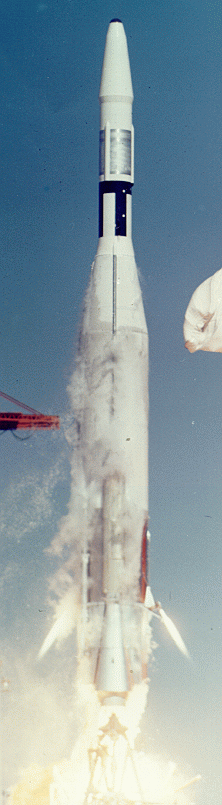
Launch of Ranger 4

Ranger 4 was a Block II Ranger spacecraft virtually identical to Ranger 3. The basic vehicle was 331 kg (730 lb), 3.1 m (10 ft) high and consisted of a lunar capsule covered with a balsawood impact-limiter, 0.65 m (26 in) in diameter, a mono-propellant mid-course motor, a 22.6 kN (5,080 lb_{f}) thrust retrorocket, and a gold- and chrome-plated hexagonal base 1.5 m (4 ft 11 in) in diameter. A large high-gain dish antenna was attached to the base. Two wing-like solar panels (5.2 m (17 ft) across) were attached to the base and deployed early in the flight.

Power was generated by 8,680 solar cells contained in the solar panels which charged an 11.5 kg (25 lb) 1 kWh capacity AgZn launching and backup battery. Spacecraft control was provided by a solid-state computer and sequencer and an Earth-controlled command system. Attitude control was provided by Sun and Earth sensors, gyroscopes, and pitch and roll jets. The telemetry system aboard the spacecraft, consisting of two 960 MHz transmitters, one at 3 W power output and the other at 50 mW power output, the high-gain antenna, and an omnidirectional antenna. White paint, gold and chrome plating, and a silvered plastic sheet encasing the retrorocket furnished thermal control.

Because heat sterilization was suspected to have caused the malfunction of Ranger 3's computer, this procedure was dropped on Ranger 4. The seismometer capsule was also painted with a sawtooth pattern for better thermal protection.

The experimental apparatus included: (1) a vidicon television camera, which employed a scan mechanism that yielded one complete frame in ten seconds; 2) a gamma-ray spectrometer mounted on a 1.8 m (5 ft 11 in) boom; (3) a radar altimeter; and (4) a seismometer to be rough-landed on the lunar surface. The seismometer was encased in the lunar capsule along with an amplifier, a 50-milliwatt transmitter, voltage control, a turnstile antenna, and six silver-cadmium batteries capable of operating the lunar capsule transmitter for 30 days, all designed to land on the Moon at 130 to 160 km/h (80 to 100 mph). The radar altimeter would be used for reflectivity studies, but was also designed to initiate capsule separation and ignite the retro-rocket.

== Mission ==
Atlas 133D and Agena 6004 arrived at Cape Canaveral in March and began preflight checkouts. Unlike with previous Ranger launches, no serious difficulties were encountered in readying the launch vehicle for flight and the probe also passed all systems tests with ease. On April 20, Ranger 4 was stacked atop the booster and liftoff took place at 3:50 pm EST on April 23. Launch proceeded perfectly this time and there were no anomalies with either the Atlas or the Agena, which performed its second burn to send Ranger 4 on a translunar trajectory.

After separation from the Agena, it was apparent that something was seriously amiss when tracking stations picked up Ranger 4's radio transmitter, but there was no telemetry data being returned or any response when commands were sent to the computer. Without telemetry, it could not be confirmed that the probe's solar panels had unfolded, but the fluctuating radio transponder indicated that Ranger 4 was tumbling and that the solar panels and high-gain antenna were not deployed either.

The Atlas and Agena had both performed perfectly, in fact so well that Ranger 4 would not even need a midcourse correction burn to impact the Moon. However, this was all futile if the spacecraft was inoperative. Ground controllers sent commands to the probe to unfurl the solar panels and high-gain antenna and manually use the attitude control system to stop the rolling motion it was in, but the probe was unresponsive. The Spacecraft Data Analysis Team at JPL concluded that the main timer in Ranger 4's computer had stopped, which disabled the telemetry system, preprogrammed events such as solar panel deployment, and also made the probe completely unresponsive to manual commands. Even though lunar impact would occur as planned, the mission was for all intents and purposes a failure. Making it a more bitter pill to swallow was the nearly-flawless launch vehicle performance. The booster problems that affected Rangers 1-3 had been resolved, only for the probe itself to completely fail, as unlike the previous missions, Ranger 4 did not return any useful data. Finding the cause of the timer malfunction could also be difficult since it had occurred during the coasting phase prior to trans-lunar injection when Ranger 4 was passing between tracking stations in the Caribbean and South Africa.

Without solar power, Ranger 4's batteries ran down on the morning of April 26 and the radio transponder ceased operating. The tiny transmitter in the seismometer capsule continued sending out a 50-milliwatt signal. According to NASA, Ranger 4 impacted the far side of the Moon (229.3 degrees E, 15.5 degrees S) at 9,600 km/h (5,970 mph) at 12:49:53 UT on April 26, 1962, after 64 hours of flight. However, the coordinates were ″guesstimated", and while the impact crater was presumably imaged by the later Lunar Reconnaissance Orbiter, the exact crater has not been identified.

NASA officials tried to put a positive spin on the mission, noting that it was the first time an American spacecraft had reached the surface of the Moon and that the probe was "far more sophisticated" than the Soviet Luna 2 space probe in 1959, which had been little more than a pressurized sphere designed to deposit pennants on the surface at impact. The excellent performance of the Atlas-Agena booster had also raised morale.

This spacecraft, similar in design to Ranger 3, was the first American spacecraft to reach another celestial body. It was also the first spacecraft to impact the far side of the Moon. Although the spacecraft did not achieve its primary objective, the Atlas-Agena-Ranger combination performed without fault for the first time.

== See also ==
- Ranger program
- Timeline of Solar System exploration
- List of artificial objects on the Moon
- List of missions to the Moon
