= Ranger 6 =

Failed NASA lunar impactor (1964)

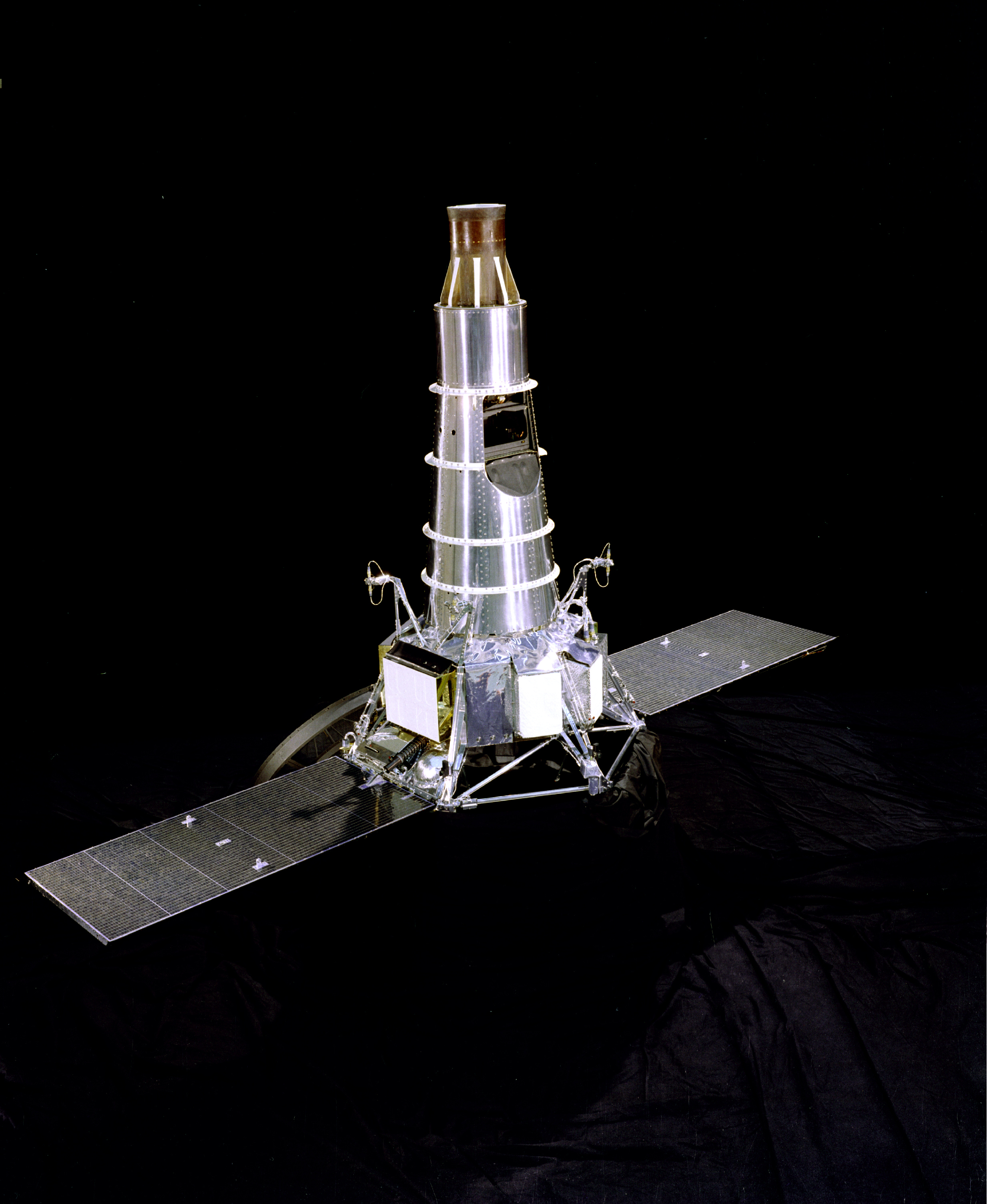
- Mission type: Lunar impactor
- Operator: NASA / JPL
- COSPAR ID: 1964-007A
- SATCAT no.: 747
- Mission duration: 2 days, 17 hours and 35 minutes

Spacecraft properties
- Manufacturer: Jet Propulsion Laboratory
- Launch mass: 364.69 kg
- Payload mass: 172 kilograms (379 lb)
- Power: 240 W

Start of mission
- Launch date: January 30, 1964, 15:49:09 GMT
- Rocket: Atlas LV-3 Agena-B 199D/AA8
- Launch site: Cape Canaveral, LC-12

Lunar impactor
- Impact date: February 2, 1964, 09:24:32 GMT
- Impact site: 09.33°N 21.52°E (Mare Tranquillitatis)
Instruments
- Television camera

Ranger 6 was a lunar probe in the NASA Ranger program, a series of robotic spacecraft of the early and mid-1960s to obtain close-up images of the Moon's surface. It was launched on January 30, 1964 and was designed to transmit high-resolution photographs of the lunar terrain during the final minutes of flight until impacting the surface. The spacecraft carried six television vidicon cameras—two wide-angle (channel F, cameras A and B) and four narrow-angle (channel P)—to accomplish these objectives. The cameras were arranged in two separate chains, or channels, each self-contained with separate power supplies, timers, and transmitters so as to afford the greatest reliability and probability of obtaining high-quality television pictures. No other experiments were carried on the spacecraft. Due to a failure of the camera system, no images were returned.

== Spacecraft design ==
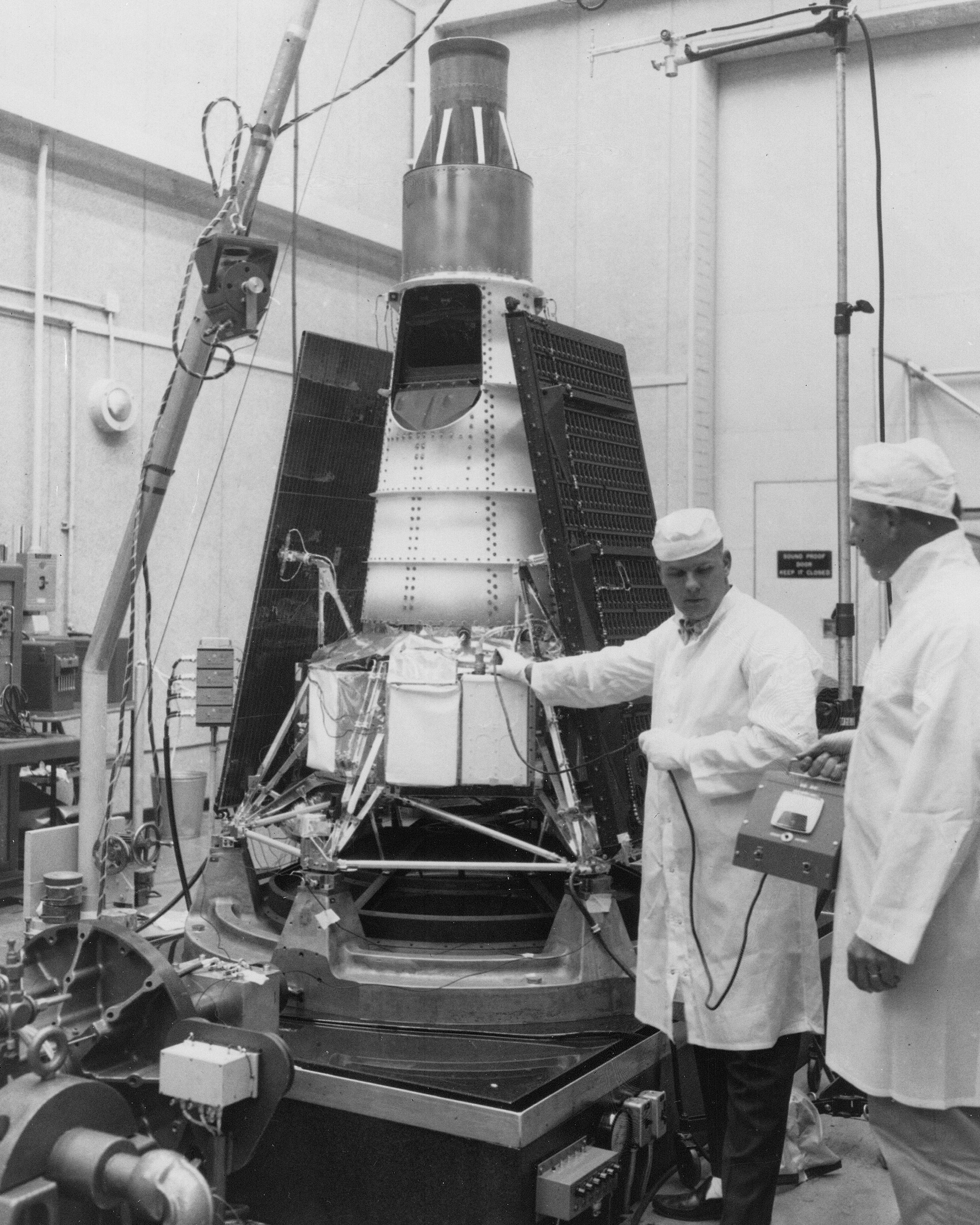
Ranger 6 in the Jet Propulsion Laboratory, Pasadena, California.

Rangers 6, 7, 8, and 9 were called Block 3 versions of the Ranger spacecraft. The spacecraft consisted of a hexagonal aluminum frame base 1.5 m across on which was mounted the propulsion and power units, topped by a truncated conical tower that held the TV cameras. Two solar panel wings, each 739 mm wide by 1537 mm long, extended from opposite edges of the base with a full span of 4.6 m, and a pointable high-gain dish antenna was hinge mounted at one of the corners of the base away from the solar panels. A cylindrical quasi omnidirectional antenna was seated on top of the conical tower. The overall height of the spacecraft was 3.6 m.

Propulsion for the mid-course trajectory correction was provided by a 224 N thrust monopropellant hydrazine engine with four jet-vane vector control. Orientation and attitude control about three axes were enabled by twelve nitrogen gas jets coupled to a system of three gyros, four primary Sun sensors, two secondary Sun sensors, and an Earth sensor. Power was supplied by 9,792 silicon solar cells contained in the two solar panels, giving a total array area of 2.3 square meters and producing 200 W. Two 1200 watt-hour AgZnO batteries rated at 26.5 V with a capacity for 9 hours of operation provided power to each of the separate communication/TV camera chains. Two 1000 watt-hour AgZnO batteries stored power for spacecraft operations.

Communications were through the quasi omnidirectional low-gain antenna and the parabolic high-gain antenna. Transmitters aboard the spacecraft included a 60 W TV channel F at 959.52 MHz, a 60 W TV channel P at 960.05 MHz, and a 3 W transponder channel 8 at 960.58 MHz. The telecommunications equipment converted the composite video signal from the camera transmitters into an RF signal for subsequent transmission through the spacecraft high-gain antenna. Sufficient video bandwidth was provided to allow for rapid framing sequences of both narrow- and wide-angle television pictures.

== Mission profile ==
The Cuban Missile Crisis had momentarily diverted attention from the failure of Ranger 5, but that mission forced a wholesale review of the entire Ranger program. Numerous theories were put forward about the cause of the failures, including poor management at JPL, overly-ambitious spacecraft designs that were unworkable and unreliable with contemporary technology, and some lesser reasons such as heat sterilization of the probes.

NASA established a Ranger Board of Inquiry on October 29, 1962, headed by Albert J. Kelley, with the mission of establishing by November 30 the reasons for the continued program failures. The board's findings included the verdict that the Ranger design was "more complicated than necessary" for a lunar mission and also required a very high degree of engineering and workmanship, neither of which were being delivered. They also concluded that heat sterilization was damaging to the delicate spacecraft systems and should be abandoned at once. They also found that JPL's handling of the program was poor, the spacecraft lacked redundant systems in the event of a malfunction, NASA's deep-space tracking network crews were not trained adequately and had deficiencies in their equipment, and finally, the Atlas-Agena booster's reliability was poor, having malfunctioned on eight Air Force and NASA launches as November 1962 ended. If the Thor-Agena was also counted in, there had been a total of nine times that an Agena B stage had malfunctioned in flight.

The board's recommendations included improving the management of projects, abandoning heat sterilization and testing of components designed for future planetary missions on Ranger, outsourcing assembly of the probes to a subcontractor, and excluding JPL from involvement in procurement and launching of the Atlas-Agena. Moreover, it suggested that NASA needed to improve their prelaunch testing and preparation of launch vehicles.

The Block III spacecraft would be stripped down to a minimum of instrumentation with the eight scientific instruments on Rangers 3-5 removed so that more space could be devoted to redundant systems hardware. This caused some protests from the scientific community that the gamma-ray and other measurements were far more valuable than simply returning photography of the Moon. Jet Propulsion Laboratory began more thorough testing of Ranger components and the second review board was put to work evaluating the reliability of the Atlas-Agena.

The booster problems would prove a particularly vexing one to solve because the U.S. Air Force, not NASA, was in charge of Atlas-Agena. Although NASA had hoped to launch planetary probes on Centaur, which was entirely under their control, that program was delayed by serious technical issues and would not be flight-ready for a long time. Having to share the booster with the U.S. Air Force and its Department of Defense missions on the West Coast created repeated mixups, delays, and technical problems. Therefore, it was recommended that NASA be given complete oversight in the procurement and launch of Atlas-Agena without the Air Force's involvement.

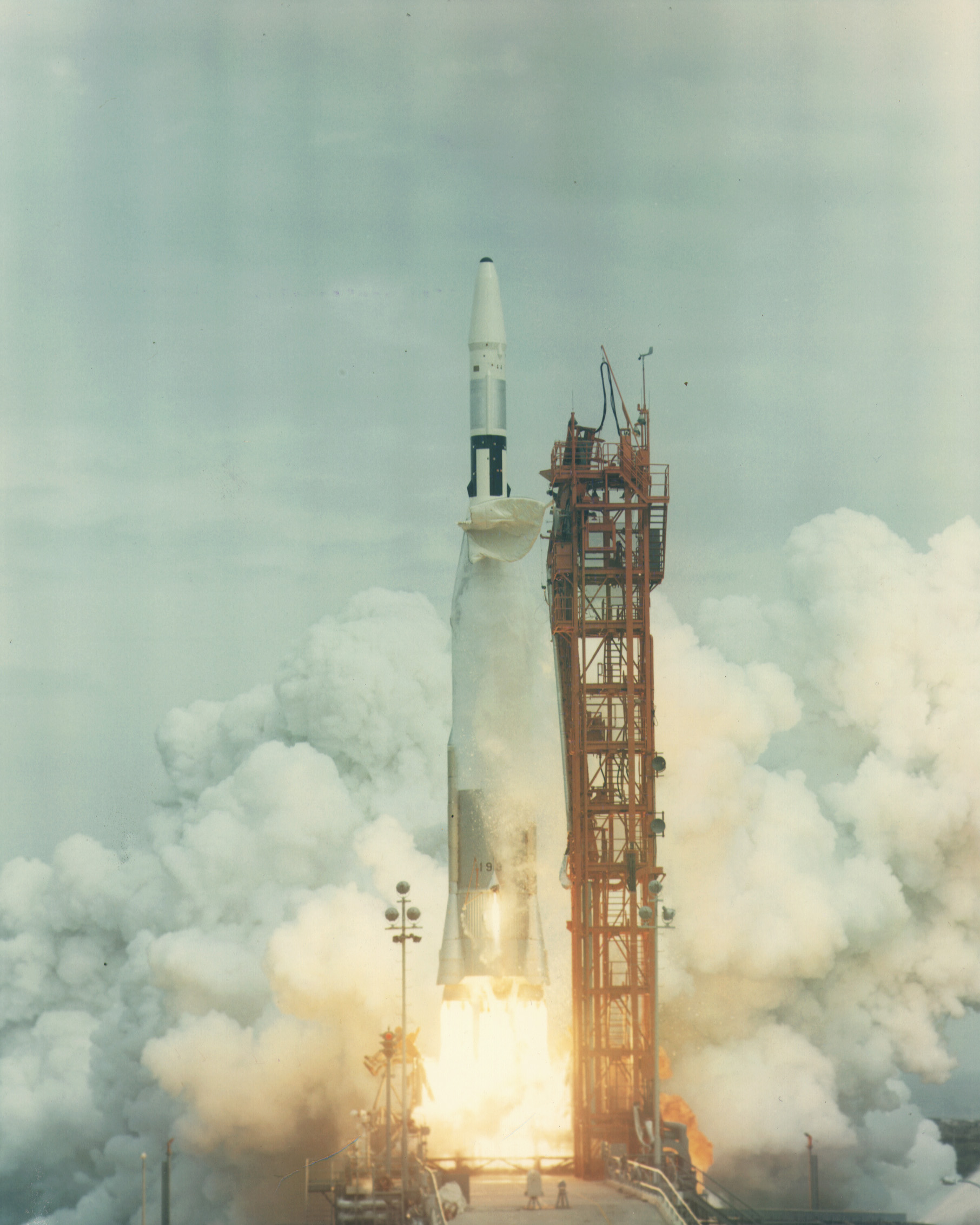
Launch of Ranger 6.

One of the important parts of the Ranger program was monitoring all Atlas and Thor-Agena launches to check for failures that could directly affect it. This job had been assigned to the Marshall Space Flight Center in Huntsville, Alabama, but was instead moved to the Lewis Research Center (LRC) in Cleveland, Ohio. LRC sent additional personnel to the Convair assembly plant in San Diego to monitor the construction of Atlas vehicles.

The review board focused on the malfunctions plaguing Atlas-Agena, in particular, the General Electric guidance system, both the Mod III-G variant used on East Coast Atlas Agenas and the Mod II-A used on West Coast vehicles, which had malfunctioned repeatedly. They recommended putting forward more detailed and stringent requirements for testing Atlas vehicles and making sure the guidance package could withstand in-flight vibration levels along with improved fabrication of wiring harnesses. Also, it was recommended that Convair establish one standardized booster configuration for all U.S. Air Force and NASA launches instead of custom modifications for each mission, replacing hardware with known design flaws with better substitutes, and improved testing of everything. Since the Air Force was in charge of Atlas-Agena, it followed that all these changes required their approval.

Finally, NASA for the first time would be given complete oversight of all its space launches. Air Force involvement in procuring, preparing, and flying launch vehicles, as well as drafting postflight mission reports for NASA missions, was to end, a step that would greatly streamline and improve program efficiency.

Problems continued, this time with getting the TV cameras for Ranger 6 in working order. The camera tubes, supplied by Radio Corporation of America, were of variable quality and it took some time to find one that matched JPL's standards.

During testing of Atlas guidance systems at General Electric, it was found that gold coating on diodes was flaking off and causing electrical shorts. Even worse, Ranger 6 had hundreds of the same diodes. This problem had easily eluded testing; moreover, ground tests could not simulate a "zero gravity" environment in space where the gold flakes would float around and form a short between the legs of the diode. In the end, there was no choice except to replace every one of the several hundred diodes inside Ranger 6's circuitry.

In April 1963, the United States Congress also decided to cut funding to the Ranger program by nearly 50% on the grounds that "no success had been achieved with any of the missions to date". This meant that plans for Ranger probes up to 13 were cancelled. Only Rangers 6-9 would be flown and they would carry little more than a TV camera.

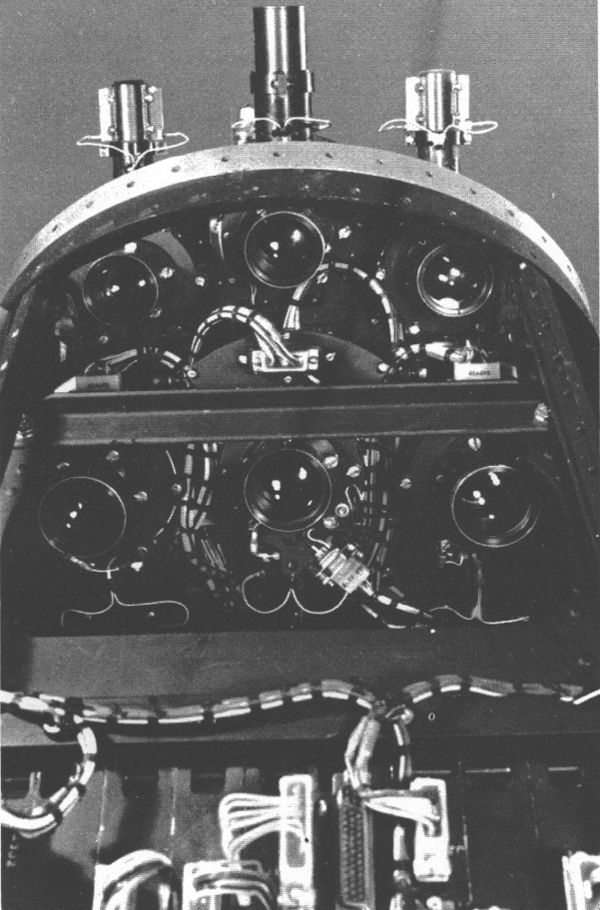
The television cameras of the spacecraft Ranger 6.

One of the Ranger program's goals was looking for potential landing sites for crewed lunar missions. At this point, it was not clear exactly what the Moon's surface was like and widespread fears existed of there being bottomless quicksand that would swallow up spacecraft and astronauts. Since the basic design of the Apollo lunar module had already been finalized by 1963, landing on the Moon would only "confirm or deny that design". JPL decided to go for an impact point near the lunar equator, in the Sea of Tranquility, partially because it was considered a prime Apollo landing spot, and also because the target had to match lighting conditions during the time of launch in January–February.

Ranger 6 and its launch vehicle (Atlas 199D and Agena 6008) arrived at Cape Canaveral in mid-December and, with the nation still mourning President Kennedy's assassination the previous month, began preflight tests.

Liftoff took place at 10:49 AM EST on January 30, 1964. The Atlas lifted smoothly into an overcast sky and disappeared from view. All went well during the boost phase and the launch vehicle's performance was excellent, indicating the hard-fought effort to improve booster reliability.

Shortly after Atlas BECO and staging, an ominous development occurred when telemetry indicated that the telemetry for the TV camera on Ranger 6 had turned itself on and then back off again 67 seconds later. Telemetry data showed everything else appears to function normally and tensions at JPL eased. The Agena placed the probe into a parking orbit and then fired for translunar injection 25 minutes after launch. After separation of Ranger 6, the solar panels and high-gain antenna were extended and all appeared normal. The launch vehicle had placed the probe on an accurate enough flight path that only a short midcourse correction burn would be required. However, the activation of the TV camera telemetry during launch remained a cause for concern. JPL technicians wanted to turn the camera on to verify its operability, however, they were running the risk of not being able to turn it off again if an electrical short had indeed occurred somewhere. Since the camera had its own batteries and did not use the probe's main power bus, they would be depleted before it could get to the Moon and eliminate any chance of returning pictures. They decided that it was not worth compromising the mission and the camera would not be touched until descent to the Moon began.

Early on the morning of January 31, the command was sent to fire the midcourse correction engine, which performed flawlessly and set the probe on an impact course with the Sea of Tranquility. On February 2, JPL technicians prepared for the final phase of the mission. Ranger 6 began its descent and trajectory calculations determined that impact would occur close to the intended area. With the probe's angle suitable for taking images, the order was given to turn on the camera with 13 minutes and 10 seconds until impact. After an initial warm-up phase, the command to power them on was sent. However, no imagery or any sign of camera operation appeared. Two more commands were sent to turn on the camera, but still, nothing happened even though all other systems continued to operate normally. At 01:24 AM, impact with the Moon occurred and telemetry transmission from Ranger 6 ceased. The mission was over and for the 12th time in a row, a U.S. attempt to send a probe to the Moon had malfunctioned. Even worse, it had occurred one week before NASA officials were planning to announce to Congress their projected US$5.3 billion budget for FY 1965, a good deal of it related to crewed and uncrewed lunar missions. NASA attempted to put a positive spin on the mission by noting that, aside from the cameras, Ranger 6 and its Atlas-Agena booster had both functioned "extremely well". A review board determined the most likely cause of failure was due to an arc-over in the TV power system when it inadvertently turned on for 67 seconds approximately 2 minutes after launch during the period of booster-engine separation.

== See also ==
- Ranger program
- Timeline of Solar System exploration
- List of artificial objects on the Moon
- List of missions to the Moon
