= Ranger 3 =

1962 robotic lunar exploration mission by NASA; malfunctioned

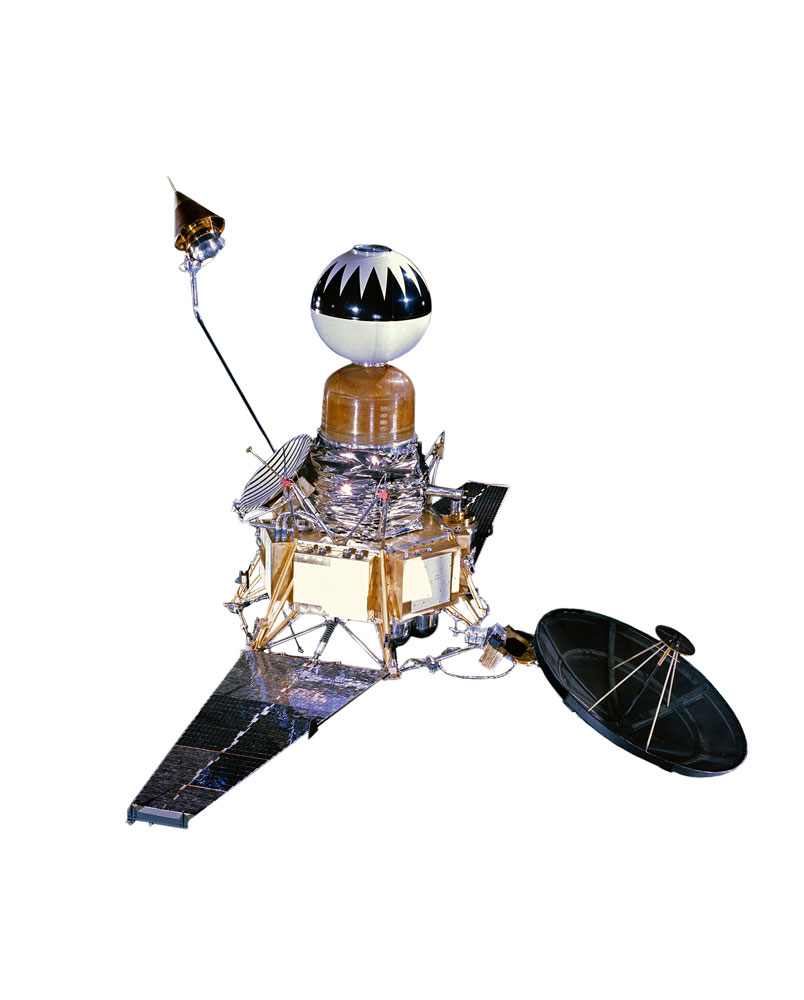
- Mission type: Lunar impactor
- Operator: NASA
- Harvard designation: 1962 Alpha 1
- COSPAR ID: 1962-001A
- SATCAT no.: 221
- Mission duration: Launch to last scientific data transmitted 1.405 days; launch day to official mission end day 5 days

Spacecraft properties
- Manufacturer: Jet Propulsion Laboratory
- Launch mass: 330 kg
- Power: 150 W

Start of mission
- Launch date: January 26, 1962, 20:30:00 UTC
- Rocket: Atlas LV-3B Agena-B
- Launch site: Cape Canaveral LC-12

End of mission
- Last contact: Last scientific data transmitted between 12:52 and 1:33 a.m. EST, January 28, 1962

Orbital parameters
- Reference system: Heliocentric
- Eccentricity: 0.083
- Perihelion altitude: 0.9839 astronomical units (147,190,000 km)
- Aphelion altitude: 1.163 astronomical units (174,000,000 km)
- Inclination: 0.398°
- Period: 406.4 days

Lunar flyby (failed impact)
- Closest approach: January 28, 1962
- Distance: 36,874 kilometers (22,912 mi)
Instruments
- Television camera
- Gamma ray spectrometer
- Radar altimeter
- Seismometer

Ranger 3 was a space exploration mission conducted by NASA to study the Moon. The Ranger 3 robotic spacecraft was launched January 26, 1962 as part of the Ranger program. Due to a series of malfunctions, the spacecraft missed the Moon by 22,000 miles (35,000 km) and entered a heliocentric orbit.

The Ranger 3 space probe was designed to transmit pictures of the lunar surface during a period of 10 minutes of flight prior to impacting on the Moon, to rough-land a seismometer capsule on the Moon, to collect gamma-ray data in flight, to study radar reflectivity of the lunar surface, and to continue testing of the Ranger program for development of lunar and interplanetary spacecraft.

== Spacecraft design ==
Ranger 3 was the first of the Block II Ranger designs. The basic vehicle was 3.1 m high and consisted of a lunar capsule covered with a balsa wood impact-limiter, 635 mm in diameter (25 inches), a mono-propellant mid-course motor, a retrorocket with a thrust of 5080 pounds force (22.6 kN), and a gold- and chrome-plated hexagonal base 1.5 m in diameter. A large high-gain dish antenna was attached to the base. Two wing-like solar panels (5.2 m across) were attached to the base and deployed early in the flight. Power was generated by 8680 solar cells contained in the solar panels which charged an 11.5 kg 1 kW·h capacity AgZn launching and backup battery. Spacecraft control was provided by a solid-state computer and sequencer and an earth-controlled command system. Attitude control was provided by Sun and Earth sensors, gyroscopes, and pitch and roll jets. The telemetry system aboard the spacecraft consisted of two 960 MHz transmitters, one at 3 W power output and the other at 50 mW power output, the high-gain antenna, and an omnidirectional antenna. White paint, gold and chrome plating, and a silvered plastic sheet encasing the retrorocket furnished thermal control.

During prelaunch preparations for Ranger 1, the spacecraft's timer had accidentally been started which led to the deployment of the solar panels inside the payload shroud. It was decided that ground testing of the onboard instruments would not be done on the Block II spacecraft because they had a functional midcourse correction engine and if a similar incident happened with them, the squibs and pyrotechnics used to deploy the solar panels could inadvertently ignite the propellants in the onboard engine, which could result in the explosion of the spacecraft on the pad and possibly take the entire launch vehicle with it. JPL officials announced that factory testing of the Ranger's systems was sufficient to root out any problems and any hardware which failed to pass the tests was not fit to fly.

The experimental apparatus included: (1) a vidicon television camera, which employed a scan mechanism that yielded one complete frame in 10 s; (2) a gamma-ray spectrometer mounted on a 1.8 m boom; (3) a radar altimeter; and (4) a seismometer to be rough-landed on the lunar surface. The seismometer (code-named "Tonto") was encased in the lunar capsule along with an amplifier, a 50 mW transmitter, voltage control, a turnstile antenna, and six silver-cadmium batteries capable of operating the lunar capsule transmitter for 30 days, all designed to land on the Moon at 130 to 160 km/h (80 to 100 mph). The radar altimeter would be used for reflectivity studies, but was also designed to initiate capsule separation and ignite the retrorocket.

== Mission ==
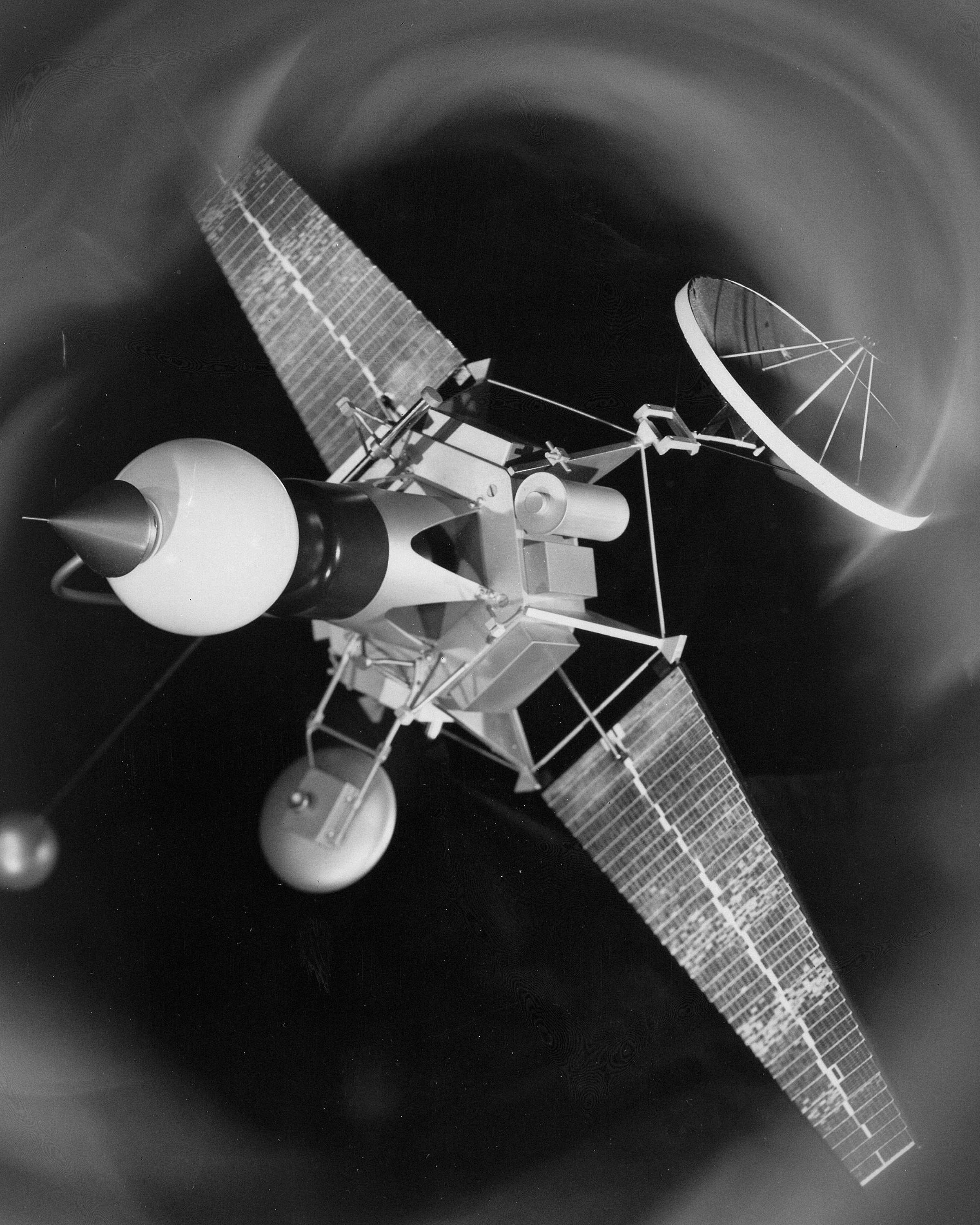
Artist's concept of Ranger 3 in space

This was the first American attempt to achieve impact on the lunar surface. The Block II Ranger spacecraft carried a TV camera that used an optical telescope that would allow imaging down to about 24 kilometers above the lunar surface during the descent. The main bus also carried a 42.6 kilogram instrument capsule that would separate from the bus at 21.4 kilometers altitude and then independently impact on the Moon. Protected by a balsa-wood outer casing, the capsule was designed to bounce several times on the lunar surface before coming to rest. The primary onboard instrument was a seismometer.

The mission was designed to boost towards the Moon by an Atlas/Agena, undergo one mid-course correction, and impact the lunar surface. At the appropriate altitude, the capsule was to separate and the retrorockets ignite to cushion the landing. A malfunction in the booster guidance system resulted in excessive spacecraft speed.

Reversed command signals caused the spacecraft to pitch in the wrong direction and the TM antenna to lose Earth acquisition, and mid-course correction was not possible. Finally, a spurious signal during the terminal maneuver prevented transmission of useful images. Ranger 3 missed the Moon by approximately 36,800 km on January 28 and entered a heliocentric orbit. Some useful engineering data were obtained from the flight.

=== Preparation for launch ===
Preparation for Ranger 3 was complicated by developmental issues with the Agena B stage, which had failed to operate correctly on Rangers 1-2. Agena was primarily the domain of the U.S. Air Force, who intended to use it for military payloads, and NASA had originally assumed it would begin flying in late 1960 or early 1961 by which time any developmental issues with the stage could be weeded out. However, Agena B ended up taking longer to put into service than originally anticipated and its performance also turned out to be somewhat less than expected, which forced some of the planned experiments on the Block II Rangers to be cancelled.

While the Thor-Agena B had begun flying in October 1960, the Atlas-Agena B did not make its maiden voyage until July 1961, meaning that Ranger 1 was only the second time this launch vehicle combination had been flown. This delay was explained by the fact that Air Force programs such as MIDAS were taking much longer to develop than Ranger. In addition, as 1961 ended, Agena Bs had malfunctioned no less than seven times (the two Ranger launches and five Thor-Agena launches).

Major General Osmond J. Ritland, Commander of the Air Force Space Systems Division in Inglewood, California, promised NASA that all problems with Agena would be corrected and, because they also affected DoD programs, the issue was being taken "quite seriously". Among other changes made would be a thorough review of all Lockheed field operating equipment and procedures. In addition, an effort would be made to ensure that checkout procedures on U.S. Air Force and NASA Agenas were identical and any differences in them eliminated.

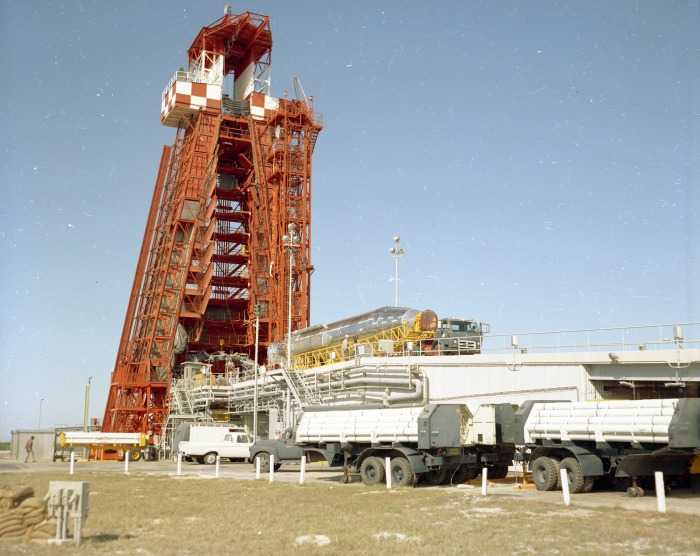
Erection of Atlas 121D on 12/21/1961

In mid-December 1961, Atlas 121D and Agena 6003 arrived at Cape Canaveral and were erected on LC-12. On January 18, 1962, Ranger 3 was stacked atop the booster, but the following day attempted fueling of the Atlas went awry when a tear was found in the intermediate bulkhead separating the LOX and RP-1 tanks. This would mean that the launch vehicle would have to be taken down from the pad for repairs, delaying the launch an entire month. However, Air Force and Convair officials instead suggested the novel solution of doing the repairs right there on LC-12. The Atlas's sustainer engine was removed and lowered into the flame deflector pit and wooden scaffolding installed so that technicians could go up into the RP-1 tank, remove the damaged intermediate bulkhead, and replace it. By January 26, repairs were completed.

=== Equipment malfunctions and trajectory errors ===
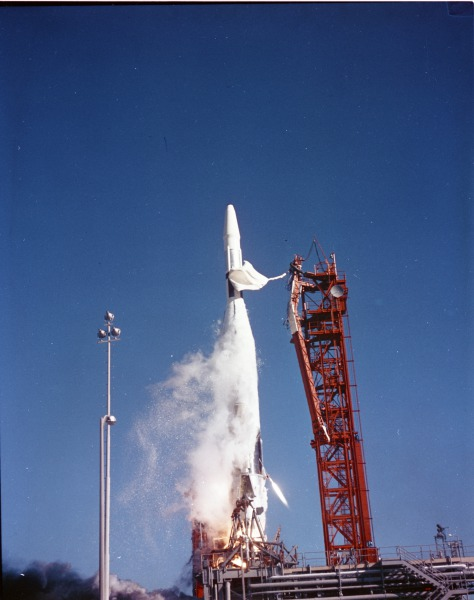
Launch of Ranger 3

Liftoff took place at 3:30 PM EST on January 26, an hour and 15 minutes before the launch window closed, after which Ranger 3 could not have been launched for another month.

At T+49 seconds into launch, the pulse beacon on the Atlas guidance system ceased operating, which prevented the transmission of any steering or cutoff directions for the remainder of the launch. Backup commands from the missile programmer ensured proper SECO and VECO commands but the lack of steering discreets resulted in an improper flight trajectory with excessive velocity.

Even worse, equipment at a Florida tracking station malfunctioned and picked up Ranger 3's orbital parameters 5 minutes late. Meanwhile, the Agena restarted and sent the probe out of Earth orbit, but another error in its guidance program resulted in yet another trajectory error. As a consequence, the spacecraft reached the Moon 14 hours early and on January 28 missed striking the Moon by 36,793 kilometers (22,862 miles).

The trajectory errors made impact with the Moon impossible, but Ranger 3 could still have been used for deep-space studies. So the flight controllers issued commands to unfurl the camera boom, and on January 28 an amended computer program was uploaded. However, midway through the upload, the probe's signal strength began to weaken and the onboard computer system failed completely. Without a functioning computer, the spacecraft was not able keep its high-gain antenna aimed at the Earth, which impeded communication with controllers on the ground.

=== Mission failure, propellant exhaustion, and cancellation ===
The TV camera did transmit images, but since the antenna was now pointed away from Earth, the received images were extremely weak and noisy. It was possible to see the reference crosses on the camera lens, illuminated by reflected sunlight from the probe's chassis, but the Moon was not visible.

With the computer dead, Ranger 3 became completely unresponsive to any ground commands and the Earth and Sun sensors were rendered useless. The gyroscopes continued to maneuver the probe and ground controllers momentarily reacquired a lock on the antenna, but without stable attitude control, they could not hold it steady. As they were unaware of the computer failure, they continued sending commands to Ranger 3 in vain. Sporadic tracking of the probe continued until January 31 when the attitude control thrusters exhausted their propellant supply, at which point the mission was officially terminated.

== See also ==
- Ranger program
- Timeline of Solar System exploration
