= Ranger 8 =

1965 NASA spacecraft to explore the Moon

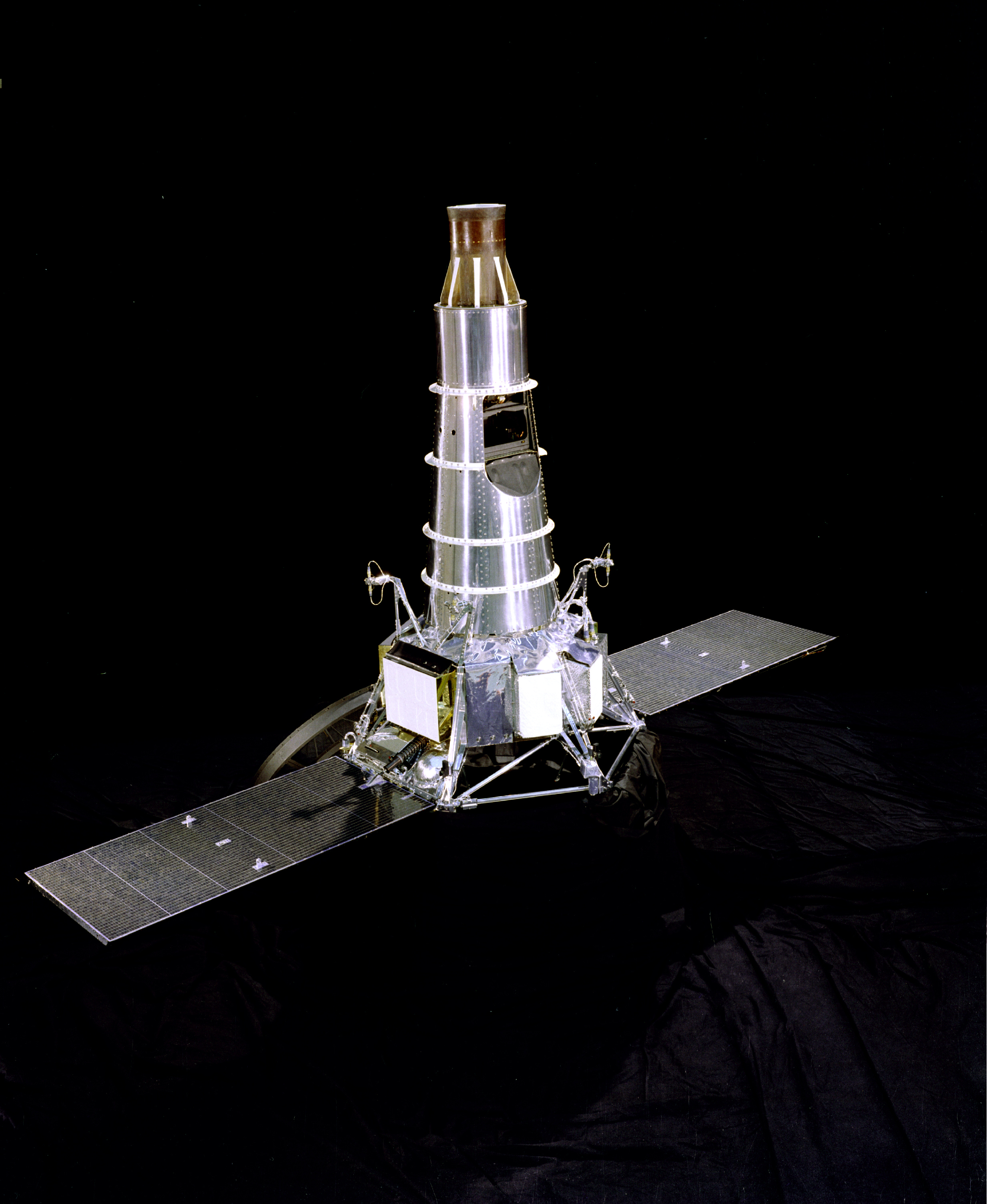
- Ranger 8
- Mission type: Lunar impactor
- Operator: NASA
- COSPAR ID: 1965-010A
- SATCAT no.: 1086
- Mission duration: 65 hours

Spacecraft properties
- Manufacturer: Jet Propulsion Laboratory
- Launch mass: 366.87 kg
- Dimensions: 1.52 m × 2.51 m (5.0 ft × 8.2 ft)
- Power: 200 W

Start of mission
- Launch date: February 17, 1965, 17:05:00 UTC
- Rocket: Atlas LV-3 Agena-B 196D/AA13
- Launch site: Cape Canaveral LC-12

Lunar impactor
- Impact date: February 20, 1965, 09:57:36.756 UTC
- Impact site: 02.6377°N 24.7881°E (Mare Tranquillitatis)
Instruments
- Vidicon Television Cameras

Ranger 8 was a lunar probe in the Ranger program, a robotic spacecraft series launched by NASA in the early-to-mid-1960s to obtain the first close-up images of the Moon's surface. These pictures helped select landing sites for Apollo missions and were used for scientific study. During its 1965 mission, Ranger 8 transmitted 7,137 lunar surface photographs before it crashed into the Moon as planned. This was the second successful mission in the Ranger series, following Ranger 7. Ranger 8's design and purpose were very similar to those of Ranger 7. It had six television vidicon cameras: two full-scan and four partial-scan. Its sole purpose was to document the Moon's surface.

== Spacecraft design ==
=== General ===
Diagram of Ranger 8.

Ranger spacecraft were originally designed, beginning in 1959, in three distinct phases called "blocks". Rangers 6, 7, 8, and 9 were the Block 3 versions. The spacecraft consisted of a hexagonal aluminum frame base 1.5 m across on which was mounted the propulsion and power units, topped by a truncated conical tower that held the television cameras. Two solar panel wings, each 739 mm wide by 1537 mm long, extended from opposite edges of the base with a full span of 4.6 m, and a pointable high-gain dish antenna was hinge mounted at one of the corners of the base away from the solar panels. A cylindrical quasi-omnidirectional antenna was seated on top of the conical tower. The overall height of the spacecraft was 3.6 m.

Propulsion for the mid-course trajectory correction was provided by a 224 N thrust monopropellant hydrazine engine with four jet-vane vector control. Orientation and attitude control about three axes was enabled by twelve nitrogen gas jets coupled to a system of three gyroscopes, four primary Sun sensors, two secondary Sun sensors, and an Earth sensor. Power was supplied by 9,792 silicon solar cells contained in the two solar panels, giving a total array area of 2.3 square meters and producing 200 W. Two 1200-watt-hour AgZnO batteries rated at 26.5 V with a capacity for 9 hours of operation provided power to each of the separate communication/TV camera chains. Two 1000-watt-hour AgZnO batteries stored power for spacecraft operations.

=== Cameras ===
The spacecraft carried six television vidicon cameras —two wide-angle (channel F, cameras A and B) and four narrow-angle (channel P) —to accomplish these objectives. The cameras were arranged in two separate chains, or channels; each was self-contained with separate power supplies, timers, and transmitters, to afford the greatest reliability and probability of obtaining high-quality television pictures. No other experiments were carried on the spacecraft.

=== Communications ===
Communications were through the quasiomnidirectional low-gain antenna and the parabolic high-gain antenna. Transmitters aboard the spacecraft included a 60-watt television channel F at 959.52 MHz, a 60-watt television channel P at 960.05 MHz, and a 3-watt transponder channel 8 at 960.58 MHz. The telecommunications equipment converted the composite video signal from the camera transmitters into a radio-frequency signal for subsequent transmission through the spacecraft's high-gain antenna. Sufficient video bandwidth was provided to allow for rapid framing sequences of both narrow- and wide-angle television pictures.

== Mission profile ==
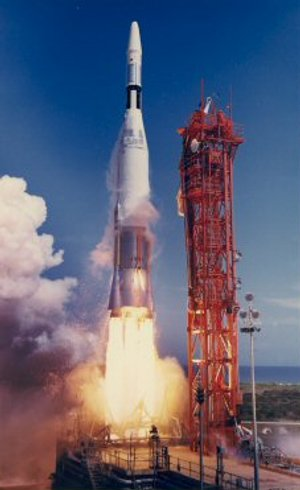
Launch of Ranger 8 by an Atlas-Agena rocket (Atlas 196D)

The Atlas 196D and Agena B 6006 boosters performed nominally, injecting the Agena and Ranger 8 into an Earth parking orbit at 185 km altitude after launch. Fourteen minutes later a 90-second burn of the Agena put the spacecraft into lunar transfer trajectory, and several minutes later the Ranger and Agena separated. The Ranger solar panels were deployed, attitude control activated, and spacecraft transmissions switched from the omniantenna to the high-gain antenna by 21:30 UT. On February 18, at a distance of 160,000 km from Earth, the planned mid-course maneuver took place, involving reorientation and a 59-second rocket burn. During the 27-minute maneuver, spacecraft transmitter power dropped severely, so that lock was lost on all telemetry channels. This continued intermittently until the rocket burn ended, at which time power returned to normal. The telemetry dropout had no serious effects on the mission. A planned terminal sequence to point the cameras more in the direction of flight just before reaching the Moon was cancelled to allow the cameras to cover a greater area of the Moon's surface.

Ranger 8 reached the Moon on February 20, 1965. The first image was taken at 9:34:32 UT at an altitude of 2510 km. Transmission of 7,137 photographs of good quality occurred over the final 23 minutes of flight. The final image taken before impact has a resolution of 1.5 meters.

Ranger 8 images

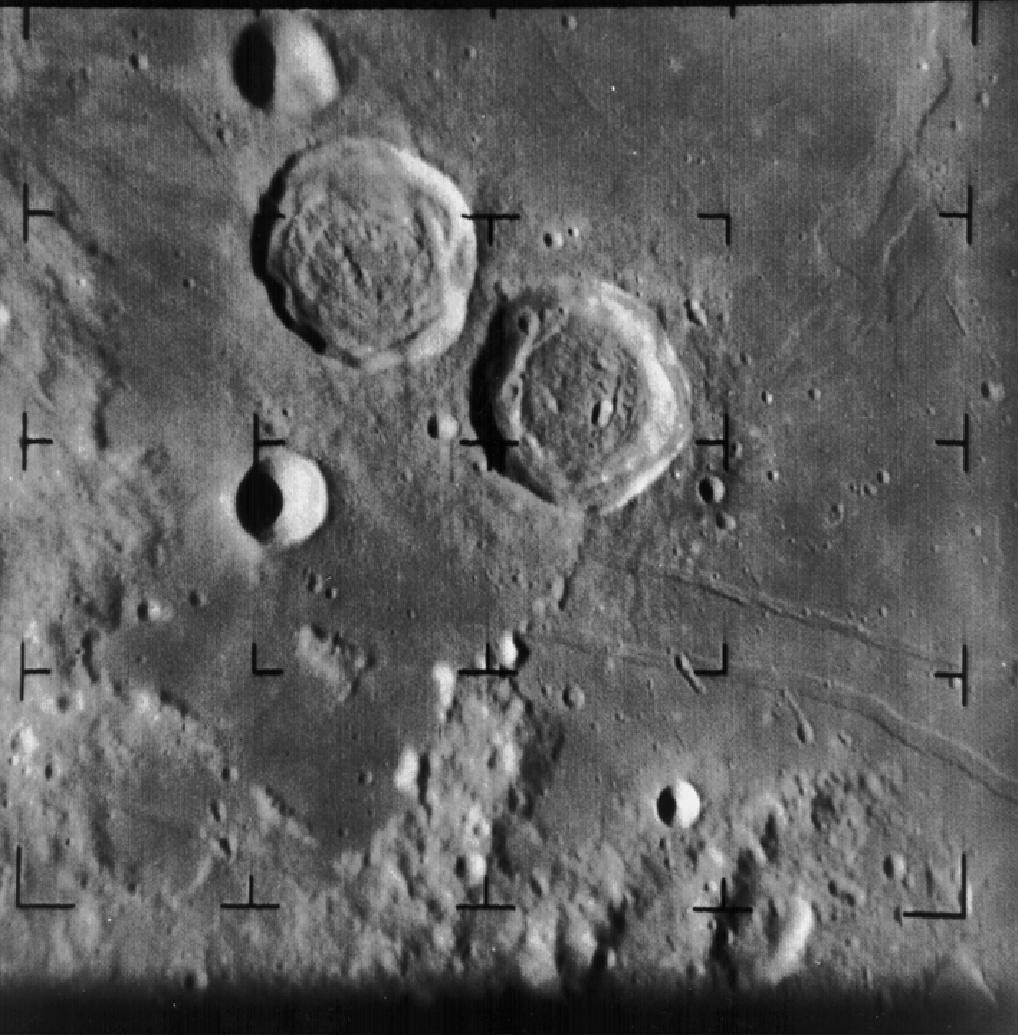
Image of the Moon from 302 km, two and a half minutes before impact, showing the craters Ritter and Sabine.

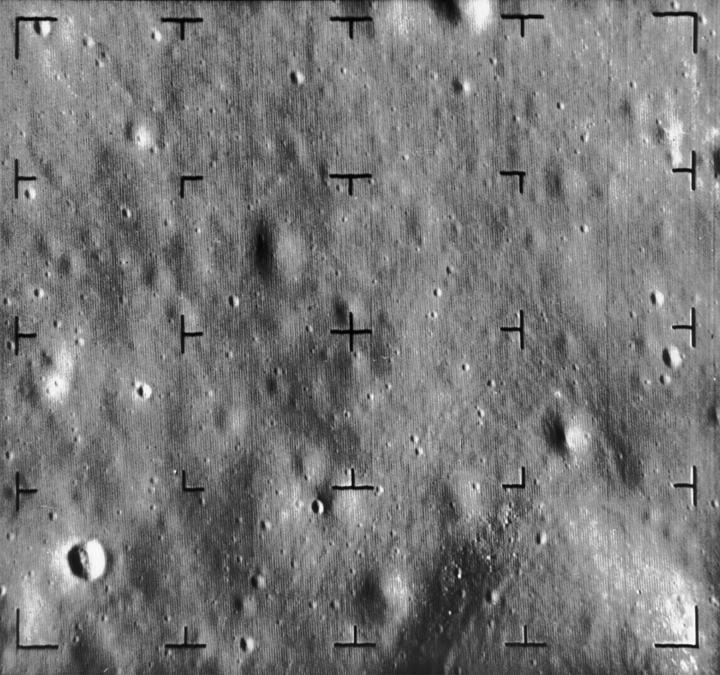
Image of the Moon from 11 km, 5 seconds before impact, showing features as small as 4 meters.

The spacecraft encountered the lunar surface in a direct hyperbolic trajectory, with incoming asymptotic direction at an angle of −13.6 degrees from the lunar equator. The orbit plane was inclined 16.5 degrees to the lunar equator. After 64.9 hours of flight, impact occurred at 09:57:36.756 UT on February 20, 1965, in Mare Tranquillitatis at approximately 2.67° N, 24.65° E. (The impact site is listed as about 2.72° N, 24.61° E in the initial report "Ranger 8 Photographs of the Moon".) Impact velocity was slightly less than 2.68 km/s, approximately 6,000 mph. The spacecraft performance was excellent.

The impact crater of Ranger 8, approximately 13.5 m wide, was later photographed by Lunar Orbiter 4.

== See also ==
- List of artificial objects on the Moon
- List of missions to the Moon
- Timeline of Solar System exploration
