= Ranger 1 =

American prototype spacecraft

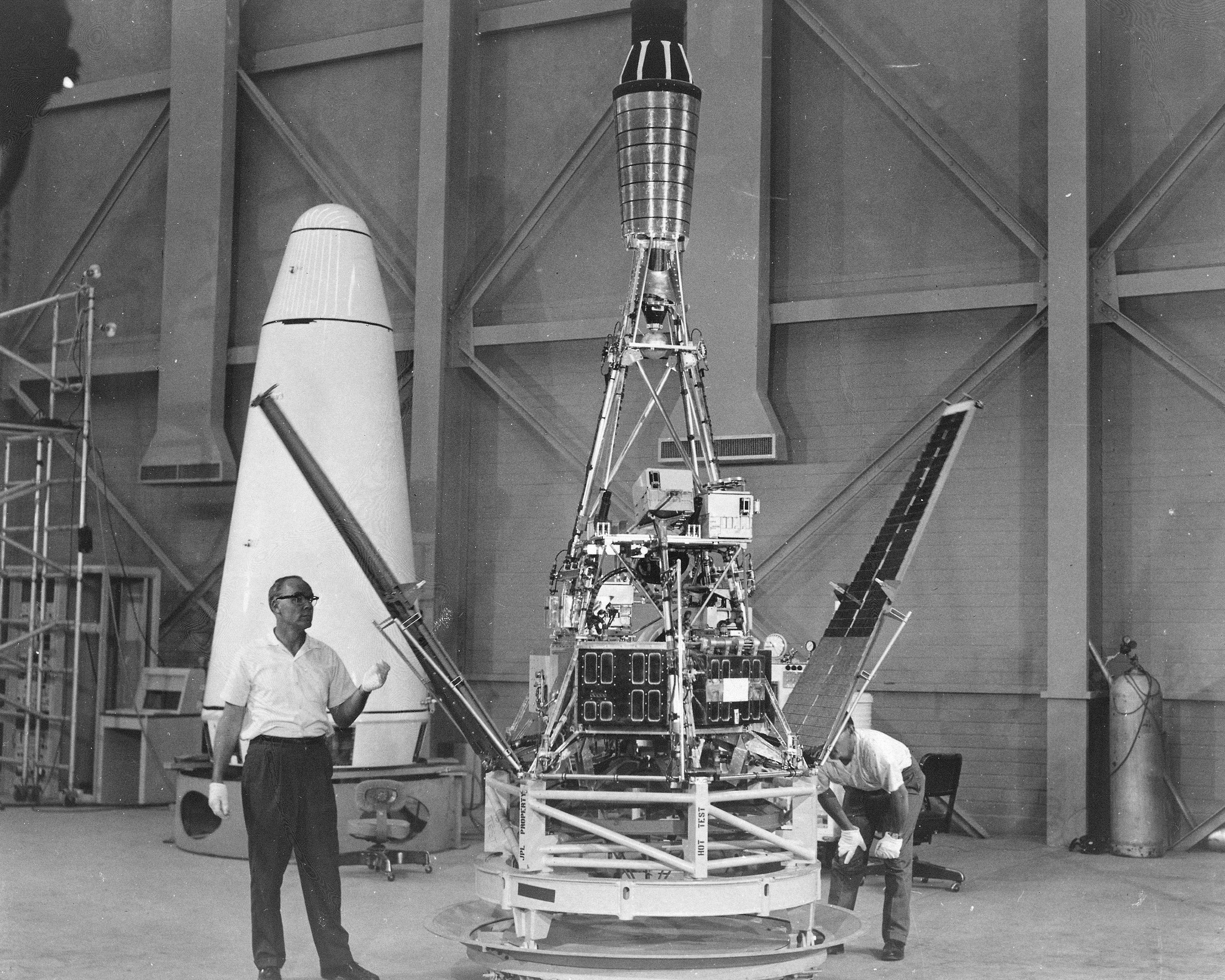
- Ranger 1 Satellite in preparation for use at the Parade of Progress Show at the Public Hall, Cleveland, Ohio, August 1964
- Mission type: Technology
- Operator: NASA
- Harvard designation: 1961 Phi 1
- COSPAR ID: 1961-021A
- SATCAT no.: 173
- Mission duration: 7 days

Spacecraft properties
- Manufacturer: Jet Propulsion Laboratory
- Launch mass: 306.2 kilograms (675 lb)
- Power: 150.0 W

Start of mission
- Launch date: August 23, 1961, 10:04:10 UTC
- Rocket: Atlas LV-3 Agena-B
- Launch site: Cape Canaveral LC-12

End of mission
- Decay date: 30 August 1961

Orbital parameters
- Reference system: Geocentric
- Regime: Low Earth (High Earth planned)
- Semi-major axis: 6,690.3 kilometres (4,157.2 mi)
- Eccentricity: 0.019939
- Perigee altitude: 179 kilometres (111 mi)
- Apogee altitude: 446 kilometres (277 mi)
- Inclination: 32.9 degrees
- Period: 91.1 minutes
- Revolution no.: 110
Instruments
- Lyman-Alpha Telescope
- Magnetometer
- Electrostatic Analyzer
- 2 Charged Particles
- Cosmic ray
- Cosmic Dust
- X-ray Scintillantion Counters

Ranger 1 was a prototype spacecraft launched as part of the Ranger program of uncrewed space missions. Its primary mission was to test the performance of those functions and parts necessary for carrying out subsequent lunar and planetary missions; a secondary objective was to study the nature of particles and fields in the space environment. Due to a launch vehicle malfunction, the spacecraft could reach only Low Earth orbit, rather than the high Earth orbit that had been planned, and was only able to complete part of its mission.

== Spacecraft design ==
The spacecraft was of the Ranger Block I design and consisted of a hexagonal base 1.5 meters (4 ft 11 in) across upon which was mounted a cone-shaped 4-meter (13 ft) high tower of aluminum struts and braces. Two solar panel wings measuring 5.2 meters (17 ft) from tip to tip extended from the base. A high-gain directional dish antenna was attached to the bottom of the base. Spacecraft experiments and other equipment were mounted on the base and tower. Instruments aboard the spacecraft included a Lyman-alpha telescope, a rubidium-vapor magnetometer, electrostatic analyzers, medium-energy range particle detectors, two triple coincidence telescopes, a cosmic-ray integrating ionization chamber, cosmic dust detectors, and solar X-ray scintillation counters. There was no camera or midcourse correction engine on the Block I spacecraft.

The communications system included the high-gain antenna and an omnidirectional medium-gain antenna and two transmitters, one at 960.1 MHz with 0.25 watts power output and the other at 960.05 MHz with 3 watts power output. Power was to be furnished by 8680 solar cells on the two panels, a 57-kilogram (126 lb) silver-zinc battery, and smaller batteries on some of the experiments. Attitude control was provided by a solid-state timing controller, Sun and Earth sensors, and pitch and roll jets. The temperature was controlled passively by gold plating, white paint, and polished aluminum surfaces.

== Mission ==
The Ranger 1 spacecraft was designed to go into an Earth parking orbit and then move into a 60,000-by-1,100,000-kilometre (37,000 by 684,000 mi) Earth orbit. The purpose of the mission was mainly as an engineering test to verify the functionality of the Ranger hardware.

=== Launch delays ===
- Delay of the 1st countdown
  - July 26: Trajectory information required by the Range Safety Officer was delayed.
  - July 27: A guidance system malfunction in the Atlas booster.
  - July 28: Engineers found that the guidance program to be fed into the Cape computer contained an error.
- 1st countdown. July 29.
  - 83 minutes before launch: Power interruptions occurred, requiring momentary holds to permit all stations to check and recover.
  - 28 minutes before launch: Commercial electrical power failed. Inadequate allowance had been made for changes in cable sag caused by variations in temperature on the new power poles recently installed at Cape Canaveral Air Force Station.
- 2nd countdown. July 30. Engineers discovered a leak in Ranger's attitude control gas system.
- 3rd countdown. July 31. A LOX tank pressure regulator seal developed a leak due to damage resulting from improper handling.
- 4th countdown. August 1. Ground controllers turned on a spacecraft command applying high voltage to the scientific experiments for calibration purposes. Immediately all stations reported a major spacecraft failure. An electrical malfunction had triggered multiple commands from the central clock timer, and Ranger 1 "turned on" as it had been programmed to do in orbit. The explosive squibs fired, solar panels extended inside the shroud, and all the experiments commenced to operate. Project engineers disengaged Ranger 1 from the Agena and hastily returned it to Hangar AE. Meantime, the launch was rescheduled for August 22, the next available opportunity. Subsequent tests and investigations determined the activating mechanism to have been a voltage discharge to the spacecraft frame; although engineers suspected one or two of the scientific instruments, they could not determine the precise source of the discharge with certainty. In the days that followed, they replaced and requalified the damaged parts and modified the circuitry to prevent a recurrence of this kind of failure.

=== Launch ===
During the first half of 1961, Lockheed introduced the new Agena B stage which replaced the early test-model Agena A of 1959-60. Agena B was more powerful and had in-orbit restart capability. Its first flight with the launch of Midas 3 on July 24 was successful. Several frustrating delays in Ranger 1's launch occurred, including one episode where the spacecraft's timer inadvertently activated on the pad, causing the solar panels to be deployed inside the payload shroud. After removing Ranger 1 and repairing it, the launch was carried out at 6:04 AM EST on August 23. All went well up to orbital injection, but the planned Agena restart went awry when the engine shut down after only a few seconds, putting the probe in a 312x105 mile track. Subsequent investigation concluded that an electrical circuit in the Agena had overheated from exposure to the Sun. The unintended orbit made it difficult to operate Ranger 1's systems correctly, although ground controllers tried to work around it. The main problem they faced was with the solar panels; Ranger 1 would experience 90 minutes of darkness while passing around the nighttime side of the Earth. In addition, the antennas at NASA's various tracking stations had difficulty locking onto the probe due to its orbital plane. During this time, the computer system repeatedly fired the attitude control jets in a vain attempt to lock onto the Sun with the effect that only one day after launch, the probe ran out of attitude control gas. At this point, it could not be stabilized and the solar panels lost their lock on the Sun. Ranger 1 thus reverted to battery power and continued transmitting until the batteries ran down on August 27 and all signals from the probe ceased. It was not a total loss; the spacecraft systems had worked well and some data on cosmic rays and radiation was returned, however the low orbit precluded the use of the magnetometer. After four days and 111 orbits, Ranger 1 reentered and burned up over the Gulf of Mexico.

== See also ==
- Ranger program
- Timeline of Solar System exploration
- List of artificial objects on the Moon
