= List of artificial objects on the Moon =

This is a partial list of artificial materials left on the Moon, many during the missions of the Apollo program. The table below does not include lesser Apollo mission artificial objects, such as a hammer and other tools, retroreflectors, Apollo Lunar Surface Experiments Packages, or the commemorative, artistic, and personal objects left by the twelve Apollo astronauts, such as the United States flags, the commemorative plaques attached to the ladders of the six Apollo Lunar Modules, the silver astronaut pin left by Alan Bean in honor of Clifton C. Williams whom he replaced, the Bible left by David Scott, the Fallen Astronaut statuette and memorial plaque placed by the crew of Apollo 15, the Apollo 11 goodwill messages disc, or the golf balls Alan Shepard hit during an Apollo 14 moonwalk.

A map depicting all known locations of artificial objects on the Moon from 1959 to 2025

Five S-IVB third stages of Saturn V rockets from the Apollo program crashed into the Moon, and are the heaviest human-made objects on the lunar surface. Humans have left over 187,400 kilograms (413,100 lb) of material on the Moon. Besides the 2019 Chang'e 4 and SLIM missions, the only artificial objects on the Moon that are still in use are the retroreflectors for the Lunar Laser Ranging experiments left there by the Apollo 11, 14, and 15 astronauts, Chandrayaan-3 lunar lander, and by the Soviet Union's Lunokhod 1 and Lunokhod 2 missions.

Objects at greater than 90 degrees east or west are on the far side of the Moon, including Ranger 4, Lunar Orbiter 1, Lunar Orbiter 2, Lunar Orbiter 3, Chang'e 4 lander and Yutu-2 rover.

Because of increasing numbers of missions to and objects at the Moon, a global registry of lunar activities has been proposed in 2023 by the Open Lunar Foundation.

== List ==
=== Legend ===
Colors
Crashed (unintentionally)
Impactor or post-mission crashed
Landed
Operational

=== Table of objects ===
Artificial object	Image	Country	Year	Mass (lb)	Mass (kg)	Status	Location	Notes
Luna 2		USSR	1959	860	390	Impactor	29.1°N 0°E	
Luna 2 Third stage of Vostok rocket		USSR	1959	20,100	9,100	Crashed (post-mission)	29.1°N 0°E	
Ranger 4		United States	1962	730	331	Crashed (controlled impact failed)	15.5°S 130.7°W	
Ranger 6		United States	1964	840	381	Impactor	9.358°N 21.480°E	
Ranger 7		United States	1964	805	365	Impactor	10.63°S 20.60°W	
Luna 5		USSR	1965	3,250	1,474	Crashed	8°N 23°W	
Luna 7		USSR	1965	3,316	1,504	Crashed	9.8°N 47.8°W	
Luna 8		USSR	1965	3,422 (launch mass)	1552 (launch mass)	Crashed	9.1°N 63.3°W	
Ranger 8		United States	1965	809	367	Impactor	2.638°N 24.787°E	
Ranger 9		United States	1965	809	367	Impactor	12.828°S 2.387°W	
Luna 9 spacecraft/descent stage		USSR	1966	3,391 (before lander capsule ejection)	1538 (before lander capsule ejection)	Crashed (post-mission)	7.08°N 64.37°W	
Luna 9 Automated Lunar Station (ALS) airbag and lander capsule		USSR	1966	218	99	Landed	7.08°N 64.37°W	
Luna 10		USSR	1966	3,500	1,600	Crashed (post-mission)	Unknown (Note: Spacecraft was in lunar orbit but is assumed to have decayed from orbit and crashed into the Moon, location unknown.)	
Luna 11		USSR	1966	3,620	1,640	Crashed (post-mission)	Unknown	
Luna 12		USSR	1966	3,680	1,670	Crashed (post-mission)	Unknown	
Surveyor 1 (separate from descent stage)		United States	1966	600	270	Landed	2.474°S 43.339°W	
Luna 13 (separate from descent stage)		USSR	1966	249	113	Landed	18.87°N 62.05°W	
Lunar Orbiter 1		United States	1966	851	386	Crashed (post-mission)	6.70°N 162°E	
Surveyor 2		United States	1966	644	292	Crashed	5.5°N 12°W	
Lunar Orbiter 2		United States	1966	849	385	Crashed (post-mission)	3.0°N 119°E	
Lunar Orbiter 3		United States	1966	851	386	Crashed (post-mission)	14.3°N 97.7°W	
Surveyor 3 (separate from descent stage)		United States	1967	619	281	Landed (Note: Portions recovered by Apollo 12 in 1969: it returned about 10 kilograms (22 lb) of the Surveyor 3's original landing mass of 302 kilograms (666 lb) to Earth to study the effects of long term exposure.)	3.015°S 23.418°W	
Lunar Orbiter 4		United States	1967	851	386	Crashed (post-mission)	Unknown	
Surveyor 4		United States	1967	624	283	Crashed	0.4°N 1.33°W	
Explorer 35		United States	1967	229	104	Crashed (post mission)	Unknown	
Lunar Orbiter 5		United States	1967	851	386	Crashed (post-mission)	3°S 83°W	
Surveyor 5 (separate from descent stage)		United States	1967	619	281	Landed	1.461°N 23.195°E	
Surveyor 6 (separate from descent stage)		United States	1967	622	282	Landed	0.47430°N 1.4275°W	
Surveyor 7 (separate from descent stage)		United States	1968	640	290	Landed	40.980°S 11.514°W	
Luna 14		USSR	1968	3,680	1,670	Crashed (post-mission)	Unknown	
Apollo 10; LM-4 Snoopy descent stage		United States	1969	4,874	2,211	Likely crashed (post-mission)	Unknown	
Apollo 11; LM-5 Eagle descent stage		United States	1969	4,484	2,034	Landed	0.6741°N 23.4730°E	
Luna 15		USSR	1969	5,992	2,718	Crashed	Unknown	
Apollo 11; LM-5 Eagle ascent stage (Note: The ascent stage of Apollo 10 was commanded to fire its engine, left lunar orbit and entered solar orbit. The ascent stage of Apollo 11 was left in orbit and thereafter its orbit possibly decayed and it crashed onto the Moon at an unknown location. The Apollo 16 ascent stage failed to crash onto moon when commanded and it decayed from orbit at a later date and also crashed at an unknown location. The ascent stages of the remaining successful missions (Apollo 12, 14, 15, and 17) were each deliberately crashed onto the Moon. Apollo 13's complete Apollo Lunar Module re-entered Earth's atmosphere after having served as a lifeboat during the aborted mission.)		United States	1969	4,815	2,184	Crashed (post-mission) or in orbit	Unknown	
Apollo 12; LM-6 Intrepid descent stage		United States	1969	4,874	2,211	Landed	3.0124°S 23.4216°W	
Apollo 12; LM-6 Intrepid ascent stage		United States	1969	4,771	2,164	Crashed (post-mission)	3.94°S 21.20°W	
Luna 16 descent stage (Note: Luna program sample return mission; mass listed is for both ascent and descent stages, though only the descent stage was left on the Moon.)		USSR	1970	3,040	1,380	Landed	0.68°S 56.3°E	
Luna 17 and Lunokhod 1		USSR	1970	12,300	5,600	Landed	38.28°N 35.0°W	
Apollo 13; S-IVB (S-IVB-508)		United States	1970	29,661	13,454	Crashed (post-mission)	2.75°S 27.86°W	
Luna 18		USSR	1971	4,140	1,880	Crashed	3.57°N 56.5°E	
Luna 19		USSR	1971	4,140	1,880	Crashed (post-mission)	Unknown	
Apollo 14; S-IVB (S-IVB-509)		United States	1971	30,900	14,016	Crashed (post-mission)	8.09°S 26.02°W	
Apollo 14; LM-8 Antares descent stage		United States	1971	4,727	2,144	Landed	3.6453°S 17.4714°W	
Apollo 14; LM-8 Antares ascent stage		United States	1971	4,705	2,132	Crashed (post-mission)	3.42°S 19.67°W	
Apollo 15; S-IVB (S-IVB-510)		United States	1971	30,944	14,036	Crashed (post-mission)	1.51°S 11.81°W	
Apollo 15; LM-10 Falcon descent stage		United States	1971	6,193	2,809	Landed	26.1322°N 3.6339°E	
Apollo 15; Lunar Roving Vehicle (LRV-1)		United States	1971	460	210	Landed	26.08°N 3.66°E	
Apollo 15; LM-10 Falcon ascent stage		United States	1971	4,700	2,132	Crashed (post-mission)	26.36°N 0.25°E	
Apollo 15 subsatellite		United States	1971	79	36	Crashed (post-mission)	Unknown	
Luna 20 descent stage		USSR	1972	<12,626	<5,727	Landed	3.57°N 56.5°E	
Apollo 16; S-IVB (S-IVB-511)		United States	1972	30,869	14,002	Crashed (post-mission)	1.921°N 24.623°W	
Apollo 16; LM-11 Orion descent stage		United States	1972	6,096	2,765	Landed	8.9730°S 15.5002°E	
Apollo 16; Lunar Roving Vehicle (LRV-2)		United States	1972	460	210	Landed	8.97°S 15.51°E	
Apollo 16; LM-11 Orion ascent stage		United States	1972	4,713	2,138	Crashed (post-mission)	Unknown	
Apollo 16 subsatellite		United States	1972	79	36	Crashed (post-mission)	Unknown	
Apollo 17; S-IVB (S-IVB-512)		United States	1972	30,780	13,960	Crashed (post-mission)	4.21°S 12.31°W	
Apollo 17; LM-12 Challenger descent stage		United States	1972	6,169	2,798	Landed	20.1908°N 30.7717°E	
Apollo 17; Lunar Roving Vehicle (LRV-3)		United States	1972	460	210	Landed	20.17°N 30.77°E	
Apollo 17; LM-12 Challenger ascent stage		United States	1972	4,740	2,150	Crashed (post-mission)	19.96°N 30.50°E	
Luna 21 and Lunokhod 2 (Note: Lander and rover weighed 4,000 pounds (1,814 kg); the rest assumed to have decayed in orbit and impacted the Moon.)		USSR	1973	10,690	4,850	Landed	25.85°N 30.45°E	
Explorer 49 (RAE-B)		United States	1973	723	328	Crashed (post-mission)	Unknown	
Luna 22		USSR	1974	8,800	4,000	Crashed (post-mission)	Unknown	
Luna 23		USSR	1974	12,300	5,600	Landed	12.75°N 62.20°E	
Luna 24 descent stage		USSR	1976	<12,787	<5,800	Landed	12.75°N 62.20°E	
Hagoromo; Hiten (Note: Was injected into lunar orbit in 1990, assumed to have decayed from orbit.)		Japan	1990	26	12	Crashed (not confirmed/post-mission)	Unknown	
Hiten		Japan	1993	315	143	Crashed (post-mission)/Impactor	34.3°S 55.6°E	
Lunar Prospector		United States	1998	278	126	Crashed (post-mission)	87.7°S 42.35°E	
SMART-1		European Space Agency	2006	677	307	Crashed (post-mission)	34.262°S 46.193°W	
Moon Impact Probe (MIP); Chandrayaan-1		India	2008	77	35	Impactor	89.76°S 39.40°W	
SELENE Rstar (Okina)		Japan	2009	117	53	Crashed (post-mission)	28.213°N 159.033°W	
SELENE Vstar (Ouna)		Japan	Unknown	117	53	Crashed (post-mission)	Unknown	
Chang'e 1		China	2009	4,400	2,000	Crashed (post-mission)	1.50°S 52.36°E	
SELENE (Kaguya) main orbiter		Japan	2009	4,374	1,984	Crashed (post-mission)	65.5°S 80.5°E	
LCROSS Shepherding Spacecraft		United States	2009	1,500	700	Crashed (post-mission)	84.729°S 49.36°W	(Note: –2.36 miles (–3.80 km) in elevation (Cabeus crater).)
LCROSS Centaur		United States	2009	5,000	2,270	Impactor	84.6780°S 48.6926°W	(Note: –2.38 miles (–3.83 km) in elevation (Cabeus crater).)
GRAIL		United States	2012	293	133	Crashed (post-mission)	75.62°N 26.63°W	
Chang'e 3 lander		China	2013	2,600	1,200	Landed/operational	44.12°N 19.51°W	
Chang'e 3 Yutu rover		China	2013	2,600	1,200	Landed	44.12°N 19.51°W	
LADEE		United States	2014	547	248	Crashed (post-mission)	10.8°N 91.6°W	
Chang'e 4 lander		China	2019	2,600	1,200	Landed/operational	45.4561°S 177.5885°E	
Chang'e 4 Yutu-2 rover		China	2019	2,600	1,200	Landed/operational	45.4561°S 177.5885°E	
Beresheet		Israel	2019	330	150	Crashed	32.5956°N 19.3496°E	
Longjiang-2		China	2019	104	47	Crashed (post-mission)	16.6956°N 159.5170°E	
Chandrayaan-2; Vikram lander Pragyan rover		India	2019	3,243	1,471	Crashed	70.8810°S 22.7840°E	
Chang'e 5 descent stage		China	2020	7,055	3,200	Landed	43.0576°N 51.9161°W	
Chang'e 5 ascent stage		China	2020	>1543	>700	Crashed (post-mission)	30.000°S 0.000°E	
Chang'e 5-T1 third stage rocket		China	2022	6100	2,800	Crashed (post-mission)	5.226°N 125.514°W	
Manfred Memorial Moon Mission		Luxembourg	2022	31	14	Crashed (post-mission together with Chang'e 5-T1 third stage rocket)	5.226°N 125.514°W	
Hakuto-R Mission 1		Japan	2023	750	340	Crashed	47.581°N 44.094°E	
Emirates Lunar Mission		United Arab Emirates	2023	750	340	Crashed	47.581°N 44.094°E	
Luna 25		Russia	2023	3,860	1,750	Crashed	57.865°S 61.360°E	
Chandrayaan-3; Vikram lander Pragyan rover		India	2023	3,863	1,752	Landed	69.373°S 32.319°E	
SLIM		Japan	2024	259.4	118.7	Landed	13.316°S 25.251°E	
LEV-1		Japan	2024	4.6	2.1	Landed	13.316°S 25.251°E	
LEV-2		Japan	2024	0.55	0.25	Landed	13.316°S 25.251°E	
IM-1 Odysseus; EagleCam		United States	2024	4,206	1,903	Landed	84.9°S 12.9°E	
Chang'e 6 descent stage		China	2024	7,055	3,200	Landed	41.6385°S 153.9852°W	
Jinchan rover		China	2024	11	5	Landed	41.6385°S 153.9852°W	
Chang'e 6 ascent stage		China	2024	>1543	>700	Crashed (post-mission)	39.0°S 180.0°E	
Blue Ghost M1		United States	2025	1034	469	Landed	18.5623°N 61.8103°E	
Hakuto-R Mission 2 Resilience		Japan	2025	750	340	Crashed	60.4445°N 4.588°W	
Tenacious rover		Luxembourg	2025	11	5	Crashed	60.4445°N 4.588°W	
IM-2 Athena; MAPP LV1; Micro-Nova; AstroAnt; Yaoki		United States	2025	4,231	1,919	Landed	84.7906°S 29.1957°E	
Falcon 9-425 upper stage (2025-010D)		United States	2026	8,600	3,900	Crashed (post-mission)	19.4759°N 93.2862°W	
Total estimated dry mass				491,035	222,729	40 major objects landed softly		

== Image gallery ==
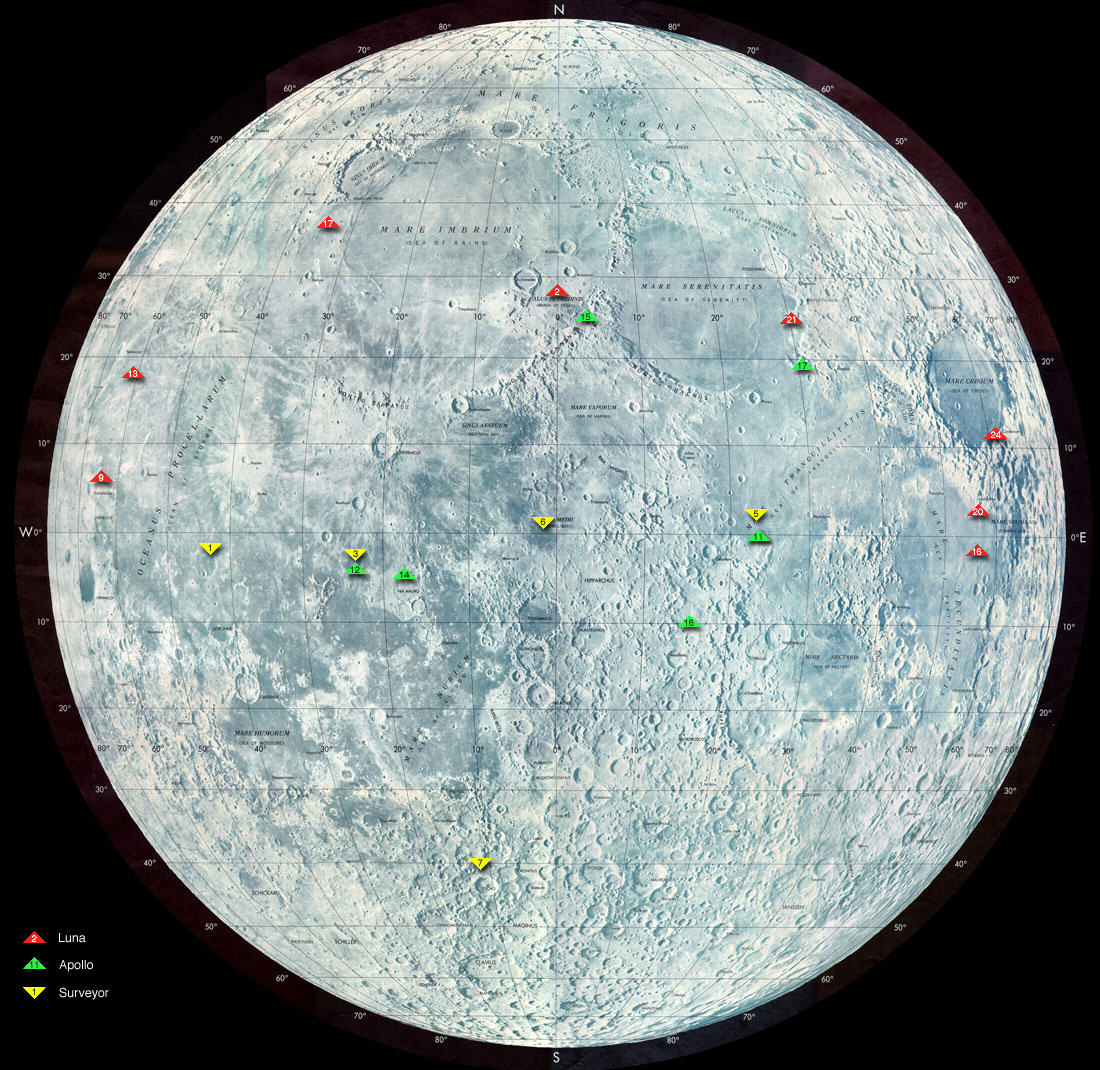
Map of the Moon showing some landing sites. (Click to enlarge)

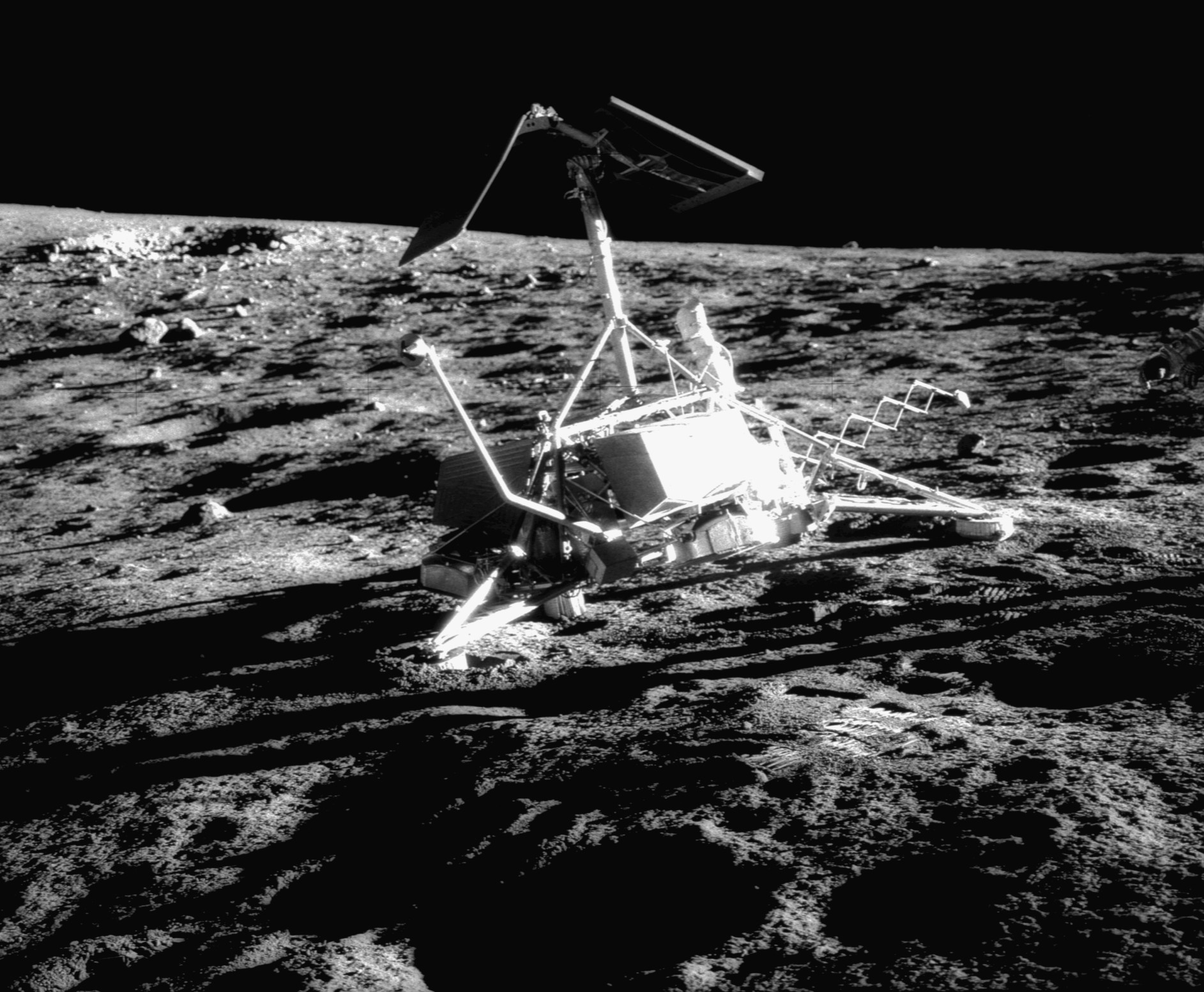
Surveyor 3 on the Moon, photographed by Alan Bean during Apollo 12 (1969)

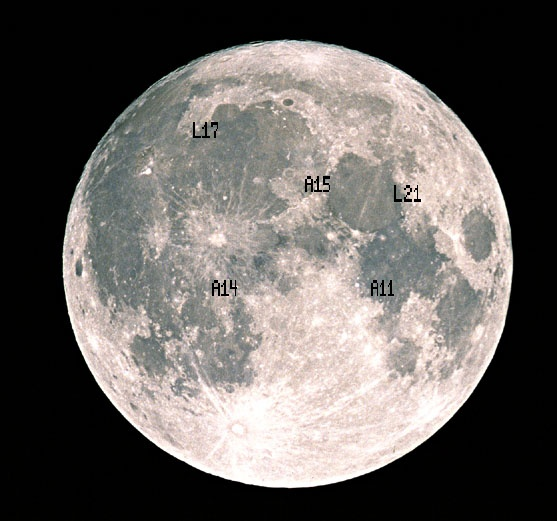
Locations of retro reflector experiments

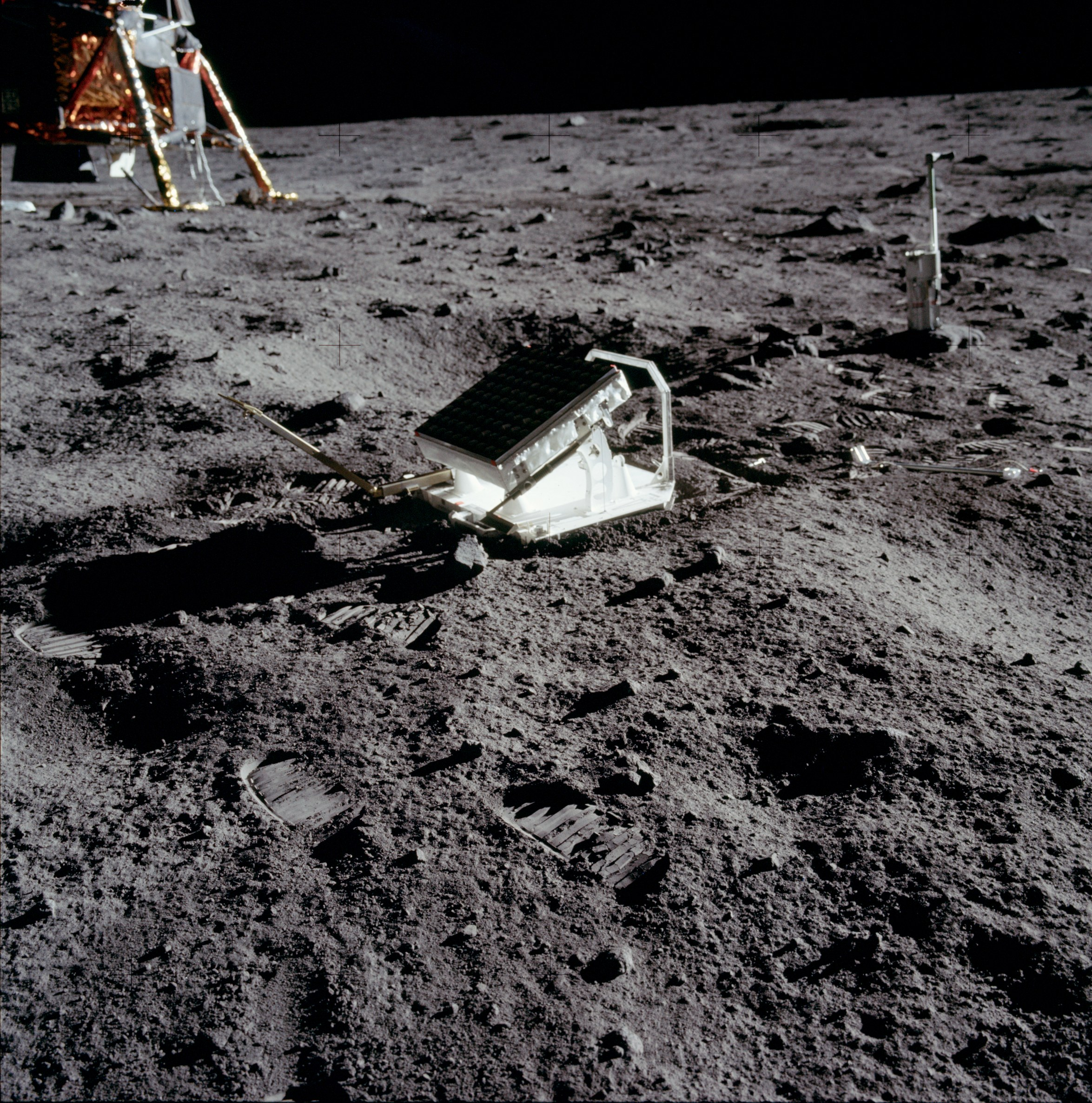
Lunar Laser Ranging experiment (LRRR)

Map of all soft landings

== See also ==
- Apollo Lunar Surface Experiments Package
- Deliberate crash landings on extraterrestrial bodies
- Human presence in space
- List of artificial objects on extraterrestrial surfaces
- List of landings on extraterrestrial bodies
- List of missions to the Moon
- List of retroreflectors on the Moon
- Lunar plaques
- Moon landing
- Timeline of Solar System exploration
- Tourism on the Moon
