= American lunar exploration program =

American lunar exploration program may refer to:

- Apollo program
- Artemis program
- Commercial Lunar Payload Services
- Constellation program
- Lunar Orbiter program
- Ranger program
- Surveyor program
