= Lunar Orbiter 3 =

NASA orbiter mission to the Moon (1967)

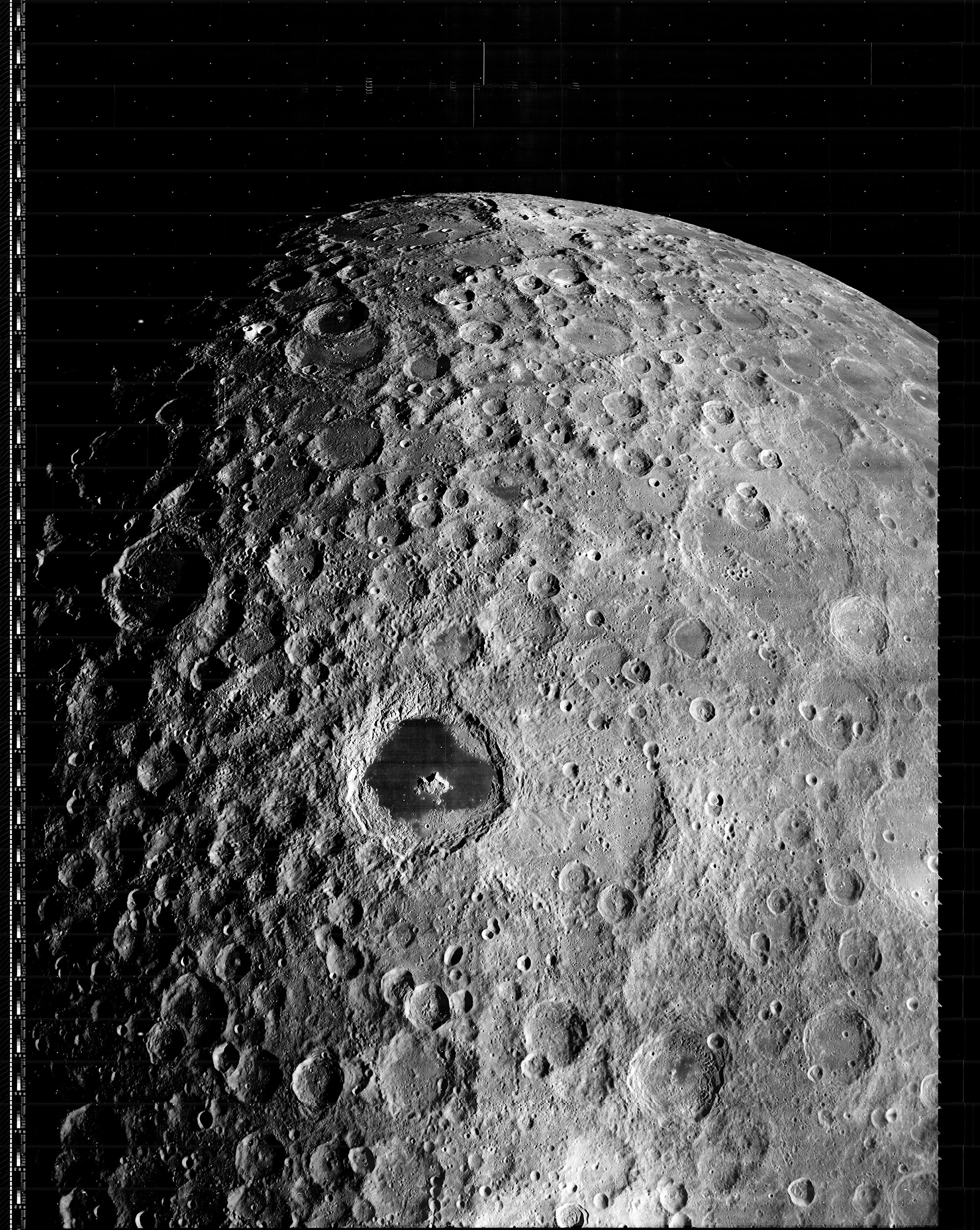
- Lunar Orbiter 3 image of the far side of the Moon, enhanced by LOIRP
- Mission type: Lunar orbiter
- Operator: NASA
- COSPAR ID: 1967-008A
- SATCAT no.: 2666
- Website: science.nasa.gov
- Mission duration: 8 months, 4 days

Spacecraft properties
- Manufacturer: Langley Research Center
- Launch mass: 385.6 kg (850 lb)
- Dimensions: 3.72 × 1.65 × 1.5 m (12.2 × 5.4 × 4.9 ft)
- Power: 375 watts

Start of mission
- Launch date: February 5, 1967, 01:17:01 UTC
- Rocket: Atlas SLV-3 Agena-D
- Launch site: Cape Canaveral LC-13

End of mission
- Disposal: Deorbited
- Decay date: October 9, 1967, 10:27:11 UTC

Orbital parameters
- Reference system: Selenocentric
- Semi-major axis: 2,694 km (1,674 mi)
- Eccentricity: 0.33
- Periselene altitude: 1,791 km (1,113 mi)
- Aposelene altitude: 3,598 km (2,236 mi)
- Inclination: 20.9 degrees
- Period: 208.1 minutes
- Epoch: February 7, 1967, 19:00:00 UTC

Lunar orbiter
- Orbital insertion: February 8, 1967, 21:54 UTC
- Impact site: 14.3°N 97.7°W
- Orbits: 1,702

Transponders
- Frequency: 2295 MHz
Instruments
- -: Cesium Iodide Dosimeters
- -: Lunar Photographic Studies
- -: Meteoroid Detectors
- -: Selenodesy

The Lunar Orbiter 3 was a spacecraft launched by NASA in 1967 as part of the Lunar Orbiter Program. It was designed primarily to photograph areas of the lunar surface for confirmation of safe landing sites for the Surveyor and Apollo missions. It was also equipped to collect selenodetic, radiation intensity, and micrometeoroid impact data.

== Mission summary ==
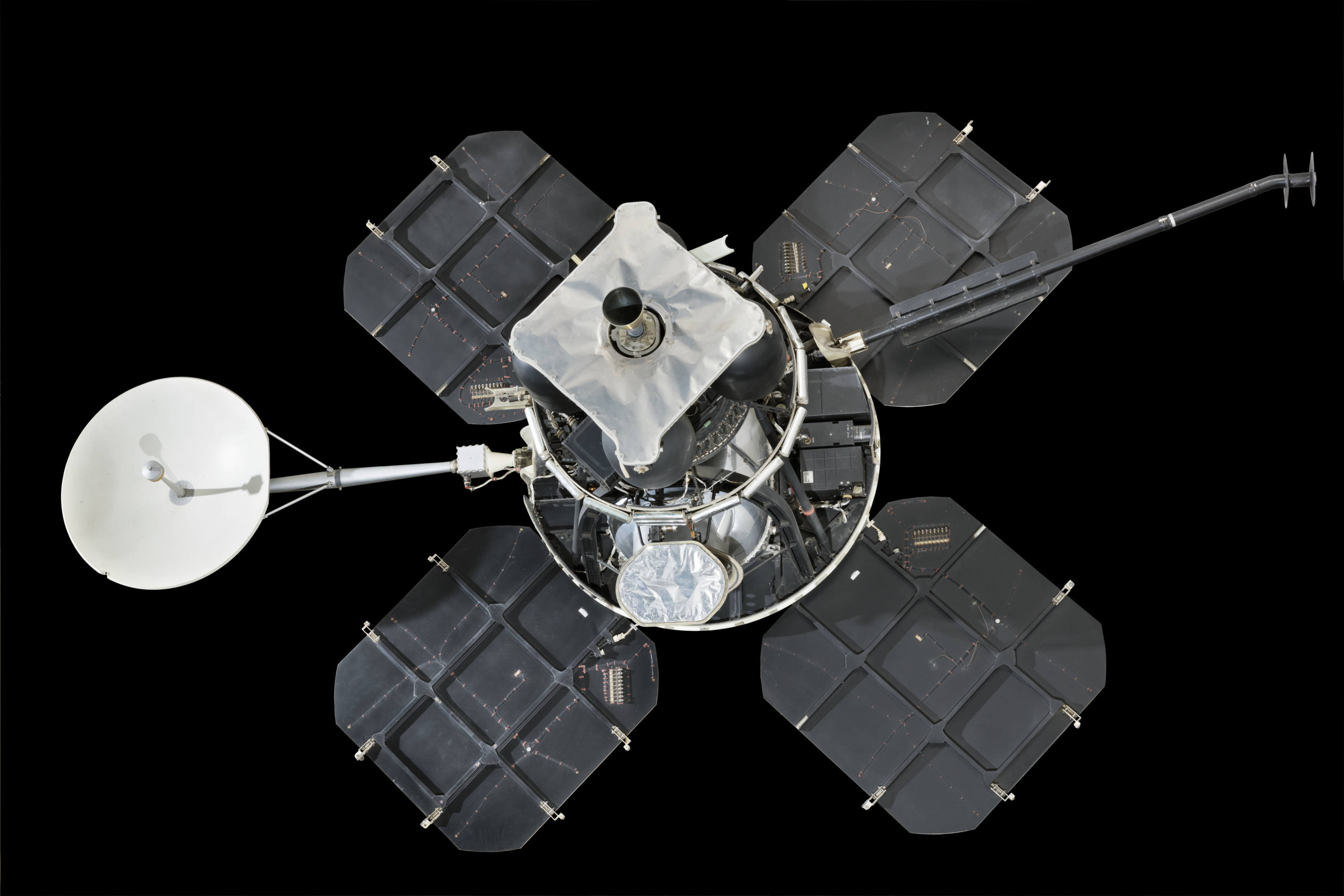
Replica of a Lunar Orbiter spacecraft

The spacecraft was placed in a cislunar trajectory and injected into an elliptical near-equatorial lunar orbit on February 8 at 21:54 UT. The orbit was 210.2 by 1,801.9 kilometres (130.6 mi × 1,119.6 mi) with an inclination of 20.9 degrees and a period of 3 hours 25 minutes. After four days (25 orbits) of tracking the orbit was changed to 55 by 1,847 kilometres (34 mi × 1,148 mi). The spacecraft acquired photographic data from February 15 to 23, 1967, and readout occurred through March 2, 1967. The film advance mechanism showed erratic behavior during this period resulting in a decision to begin readout of the frames earlier than planned. The frames were read out successfully until March 4 when the film advance motor burned out, leaving about 25% of the frames on the takeup reel, unable to be read.

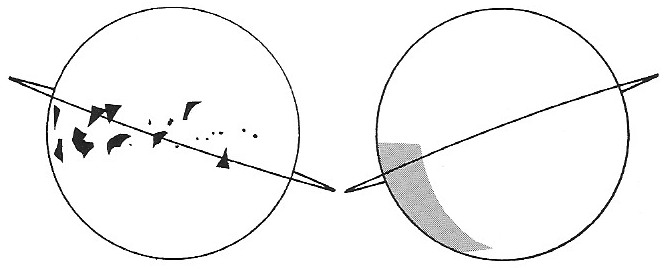
Spacecraft orbit and photographic coverage on the near side (left) and far side (right)

A total of 149 medium resolution and 477 high resolution frames were returned. The frames were of excellent quality with resolution down to 1 metre (3 ft 3 in). Included was a frame of the Surveyor 1 landing site, permitting identification of the location of the spacecraft on the surface. The future landing site of Apollo 14 including Cone crater, was photographed by the orbiter. Accurate data were acquired from all other experiments throughout the mission. The spacecraft was used for tracking purposes until it struck the lunar surface on command at 14.3 degrees N latitude, 97.7 degrees W longitude (selenographic coordinates) on October 9, 1967.

Instruments
Lunar Photographic Studies	Evaluation of Apollo and Surveyor landing sites
Meteoroid Detectors	Detection of micrometeoroids in the lunar environment
Caesium Iodide Dosimeters	Radiation environment en route to and near the Moon
Selenodesy	Gravitational field and physical properties of the Moon

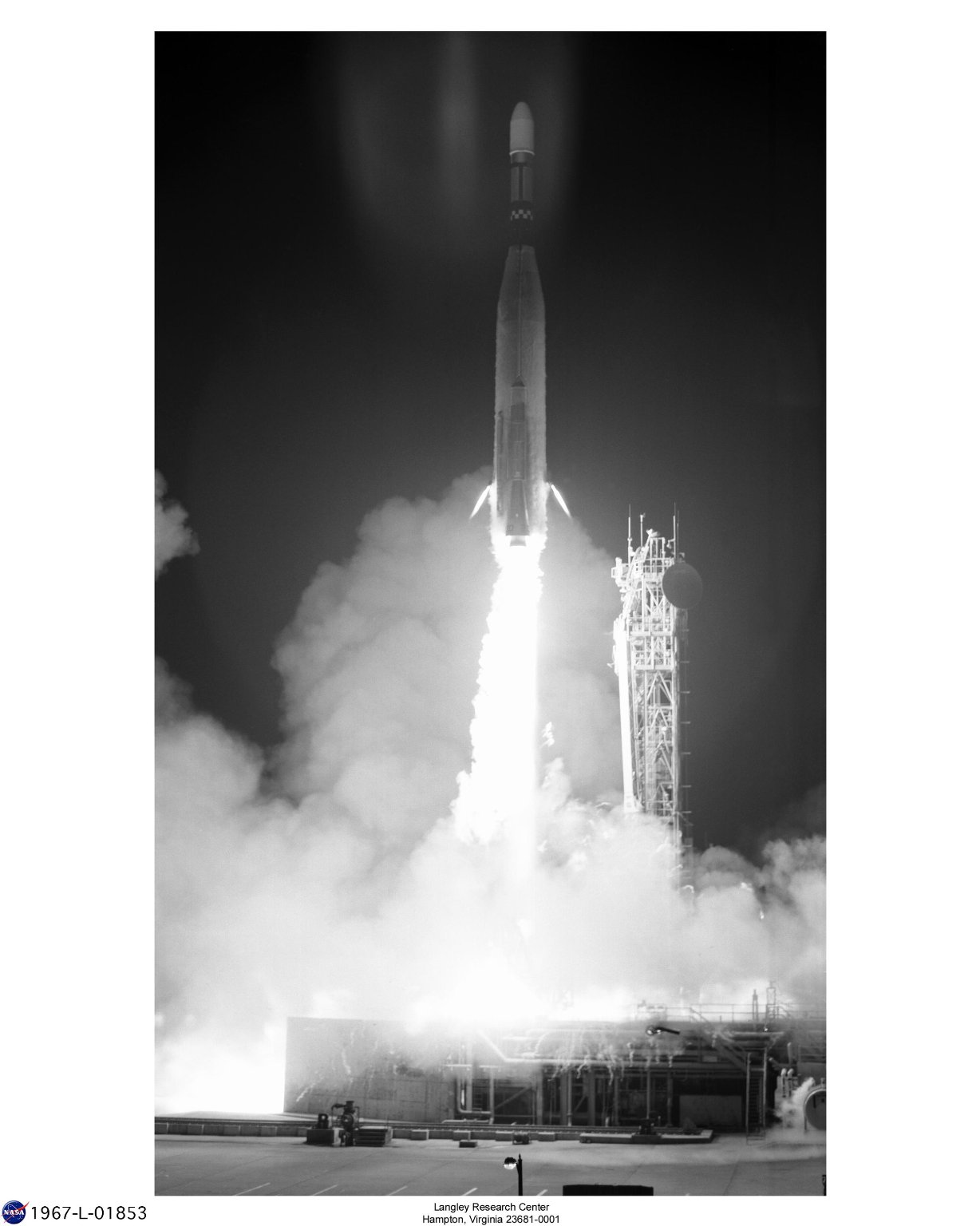
Launch of Lunar Orbiter 3 from an Atlas-Agena rocket on February 5, 1967

Unnamed rille southwest of Manners crater in Mare Tranquillitatis, on February 16, 1967 (3.57°N 19.49°E)

Rima Schröter, on February 18, 1967 (0.93°N 6.21°W)

View inside Hipparchus crater on February 19, 1967 (4.77°S 4.28°E)

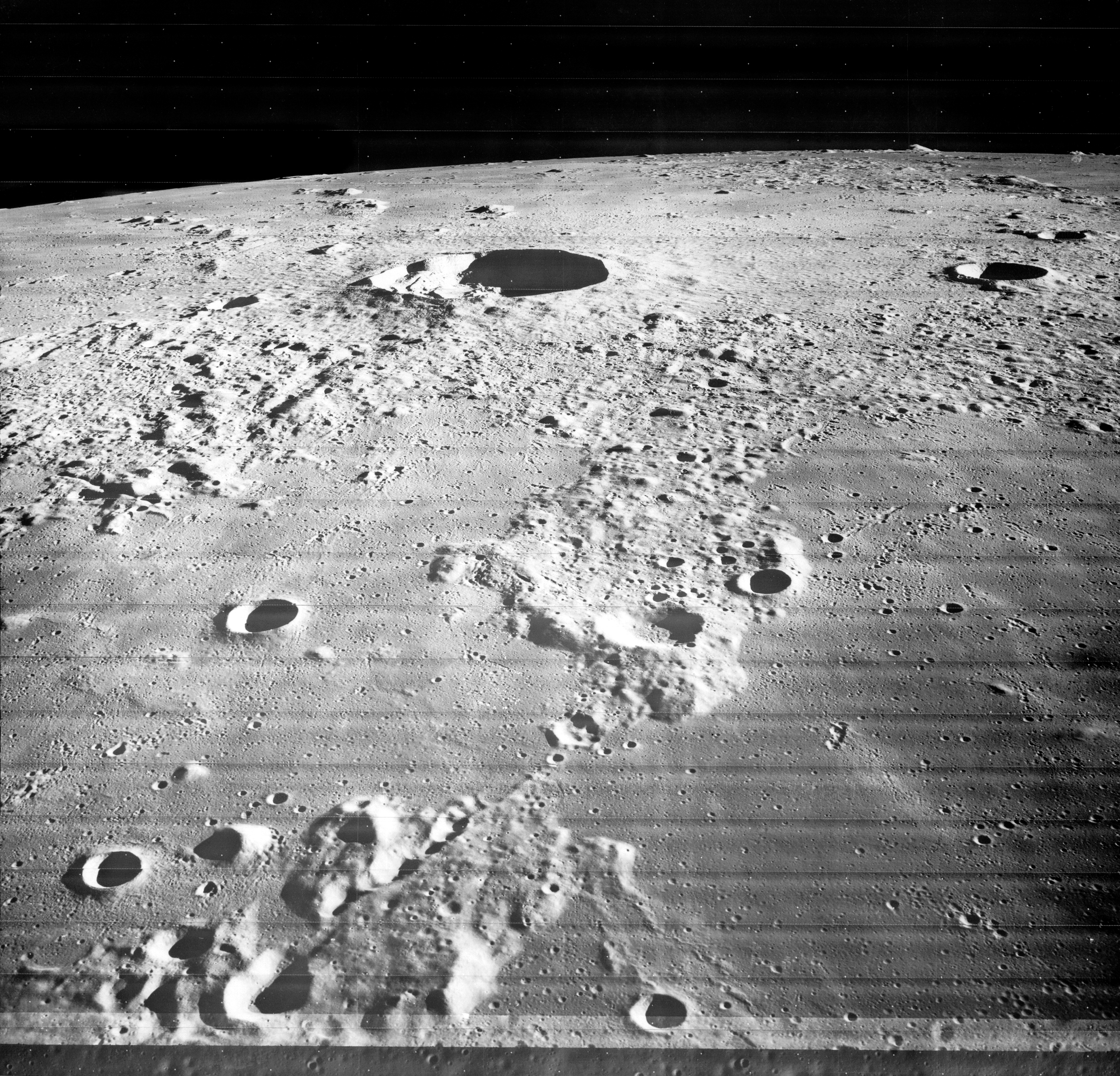
Kepler crater on April 28, 1967

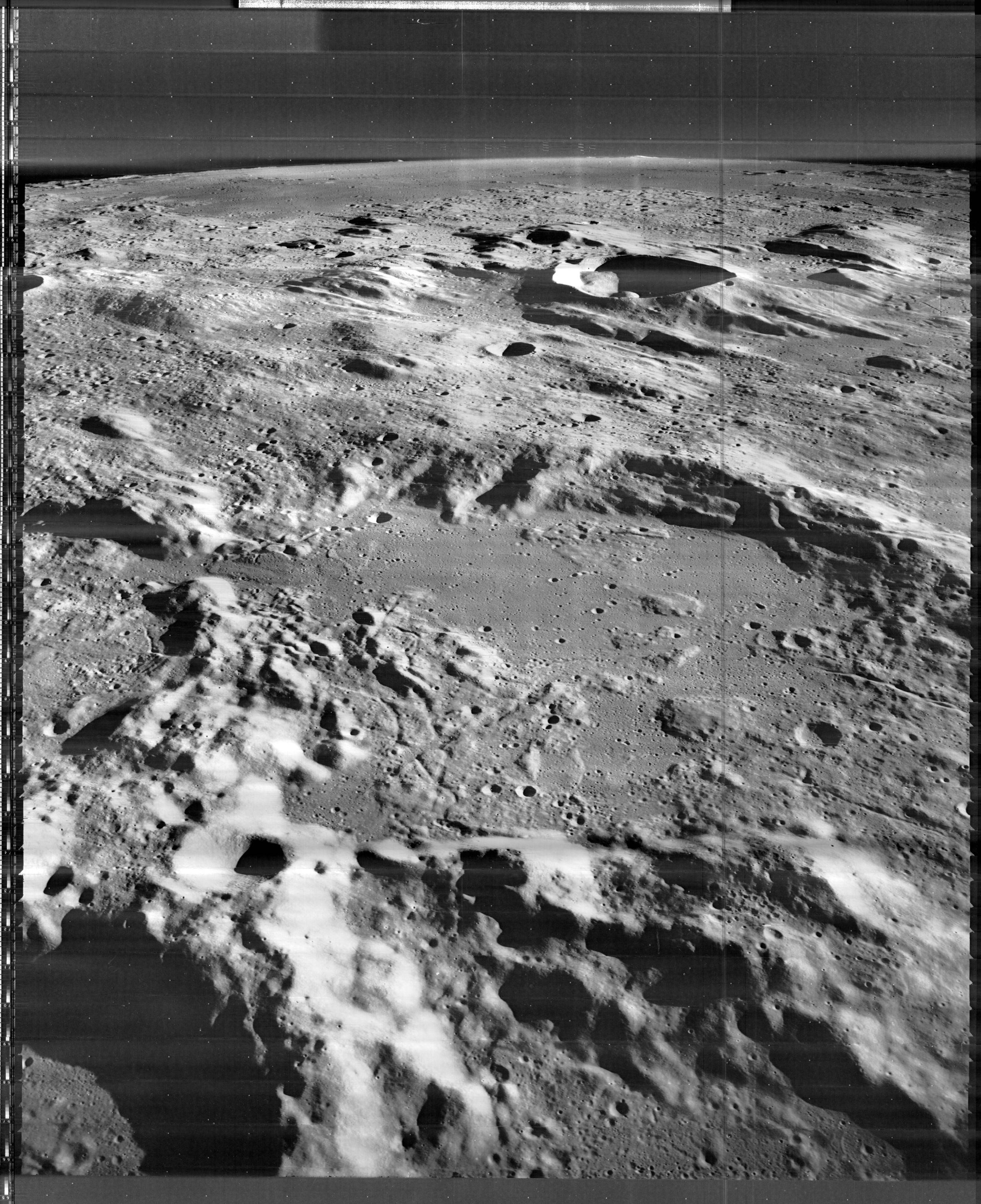
Oblique view of Murchison crater

== See also ==
- Lunar Orbiter Image Recovery Project
- Exploration of the Moon
- List of artificial objects on the Moon
- List of missions to the Moon
  - Lunar Orbiter 1
  - Lunar Orbiter 2
  - Lunar Orbiter 4
  - Lunar Orbiter 5
