= Lunar Orbiter 1 =

NASA orbiter mission to the Moon (1966)

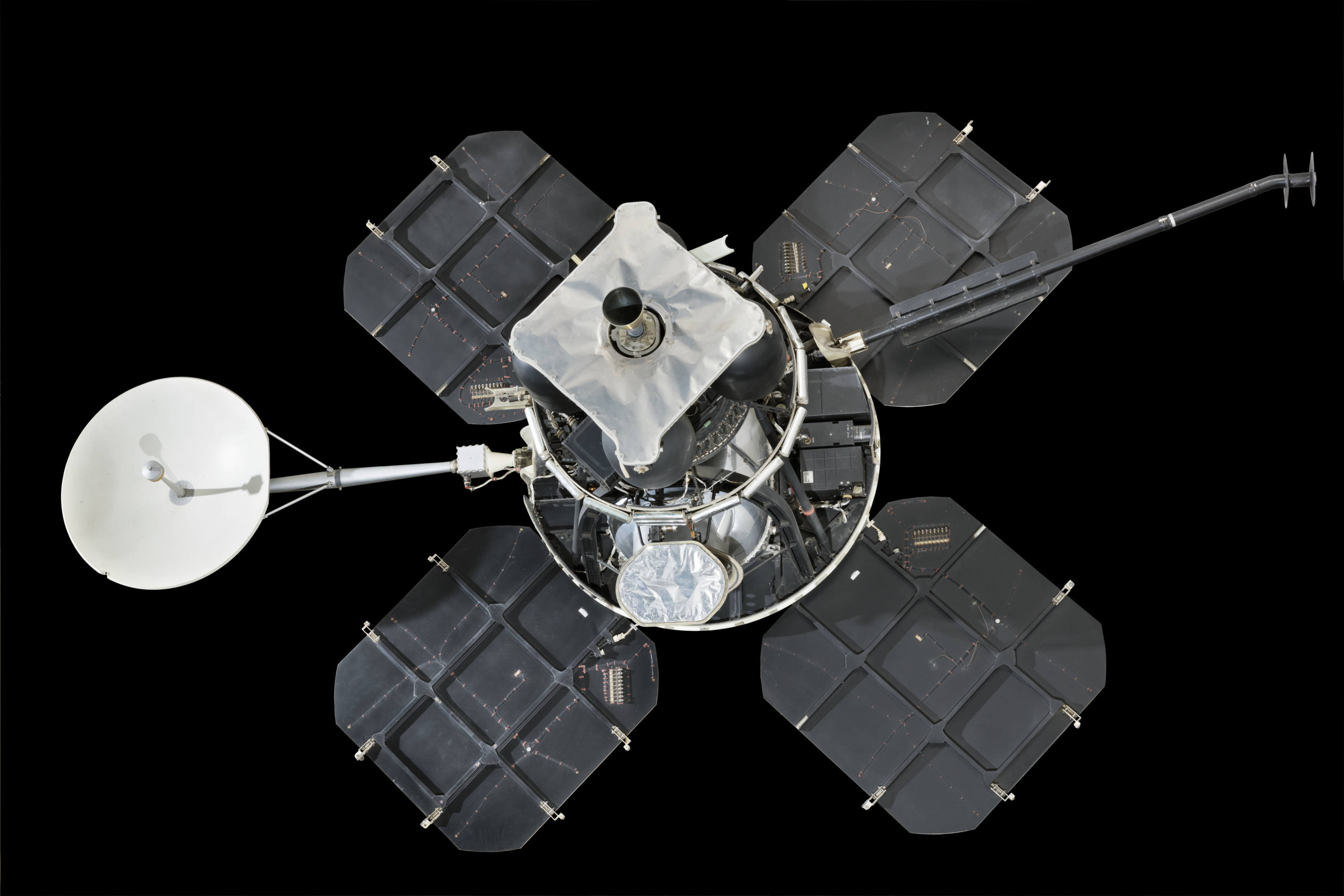
- Replica of a Lunar Orbiter spacecraft
- Mission type: Lunar orbiter
- Operator: NASA
- COSPAR ID: 1966-073A
- SATCAT no.: 2394
- Website: science.nasa.gov
- Mission duration: 2 months, 19 days

Spacecraft properties
- Manufacturer: Boeing
- Launch mass: 386.9 kg (853 lb)
- Dimensions: 3.72 × 1.65 × 1.5 m (12.2 × 5.4 × 4.9 ft)
- Power: 375 watts

Start of mission
- Launch date: August 10, 1966, 19:31 UTC
- Rocket: Atlas SLV-3 Agena-D
- Launch site: Cape Canaveral LC-13

End of mission
- Disposal: Deorbited
- Decay date: October 29, 1966, 13:29:06 UTC

Orbital parameters
- Reference system: Selenocentric
- Semi-major axis: 2,694 km (1,674 mi)
- Eccentricity: 0.33
- Periselene altitude: 189.1 to 40.5 km (117.5 to 25.2 mi)
- Aposelene altitude: 1,866.8 km (1,160.0 mi)
- Inclination: 12 degrees
- Period: 208.1 minutes

Lunar orbiter
- Orbital insertion: August 14, 1966
- Impact site: 6.35°N 160.72°E
- Orbits: 577

Transponders
- Frequency: 2295 MHz
Instruments
- -: Cesium Iodide Dosimeters
- -: Lunar Photographic Studies
- -: Meteoroid Detectors
- -: Selenodesy

The 1966 Lunar Orbiter 1 robotic spacecraft mission, part of NASA's Lunar Orbiter program, was the first American spacecraft to orbit the Moon. It was designed primarily to photograph smooth areas of the lunar surface for selection and verification of safe landing sites for the Surveyor and Apollo missions. It was also equipped to collect selenodetic, radiation intensity, and micrometeoroid impact data.

== Mission summary ==
Mission controllers injected the spacecraft into a parking orbit around Earth on August 10, 1966, at 19:31 UTC. The trans-lunar injection burn occurred at 20:04 UTC. The spacecraft experienced a temporary failure of the Canopus star tracker (probably due to stray sunlight) and overheating during its cruise to the Moon. The star tracker problem was resolved by navigating using the Moon as a reference, and the overheating was abated by orienting the spacecraft 36 degrees off-Sun to lower the temperature.

Lunar Orbiter 1 was injected into an elliptical near-equatorial lunar orbit 92.1 hours after launch. The initial orbit was 189.1 km × 1,866.8 km (117.5 mi × 1,160.0 mi) and had a period of 3 hours 37 minutes and an inclination of 12.2 degrees. On August 21, perilune was dropped to 58 km (36 mi) and on August 25 to 40.5 km (25.2 mi). The spacecraft acquired photographic data from August 18 to 29, 1966, and readout occurred through September 14, 1966.

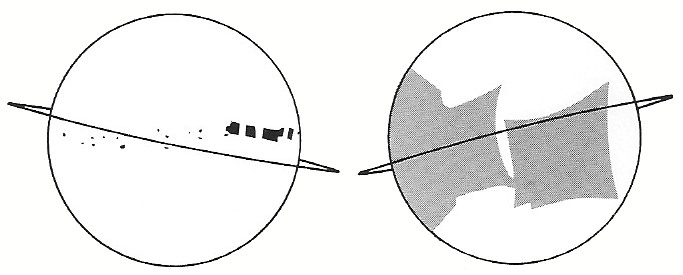
Spacecraft orbit and photographic coverage on the near side (left) and far side (right)

A total of 42 high-resolution and 187 medium-resolution frames were taken and transmitted to Earth covering more than 5 million square kilometers of the Moon's surface, accomplishing about 75% of the intended mission, although a number of the early high-resolution photos showed severe smearing. It also took the first two pictures of Earth from the Moon. Accurate data were acquired from all other experiments throughout the mission.

While not disclosed until after the end of the Cold War, the imaging system on the Lunar Orbiter spacecraft were the same Eastman Kodak cameras developed by the National Reconnaissance Office (NRO) for the SAMOS reconnaissance satellites. NASA extended the camera innovation further by developing the film on board the spacecraft and then scanning the photos for transmission via a video signal.

Orbit tracking showed a slight "pear-shape" of the Moon based on the gravity field, and no micrometeorite impacts were detected. The spacecraft was tracked until it impacted the lunar surface on command at 7 degrees north latitude, 161 degrees east longitude (selenographic coordinates) on the Moon's far side on October 29, 1966, on its 577th orbit. The early end of the nominal one-year mission resulted from a shortage of remaining attitude control gas and other deteriorating conditions and was planned to avoid transmission interference with Lunar Orbiter 2.

Instruments
Lunar Photographic Studies	Evaluation of Apollo and Surveyor landing sites
Meteoroid Detectors	Detection of micrometeoroids in the lunar environment
Caesium Iodide Dosimeters	Radiation environment en route to and near the Moon
Selenodesy	Gravitational field and physical properties of the Moon

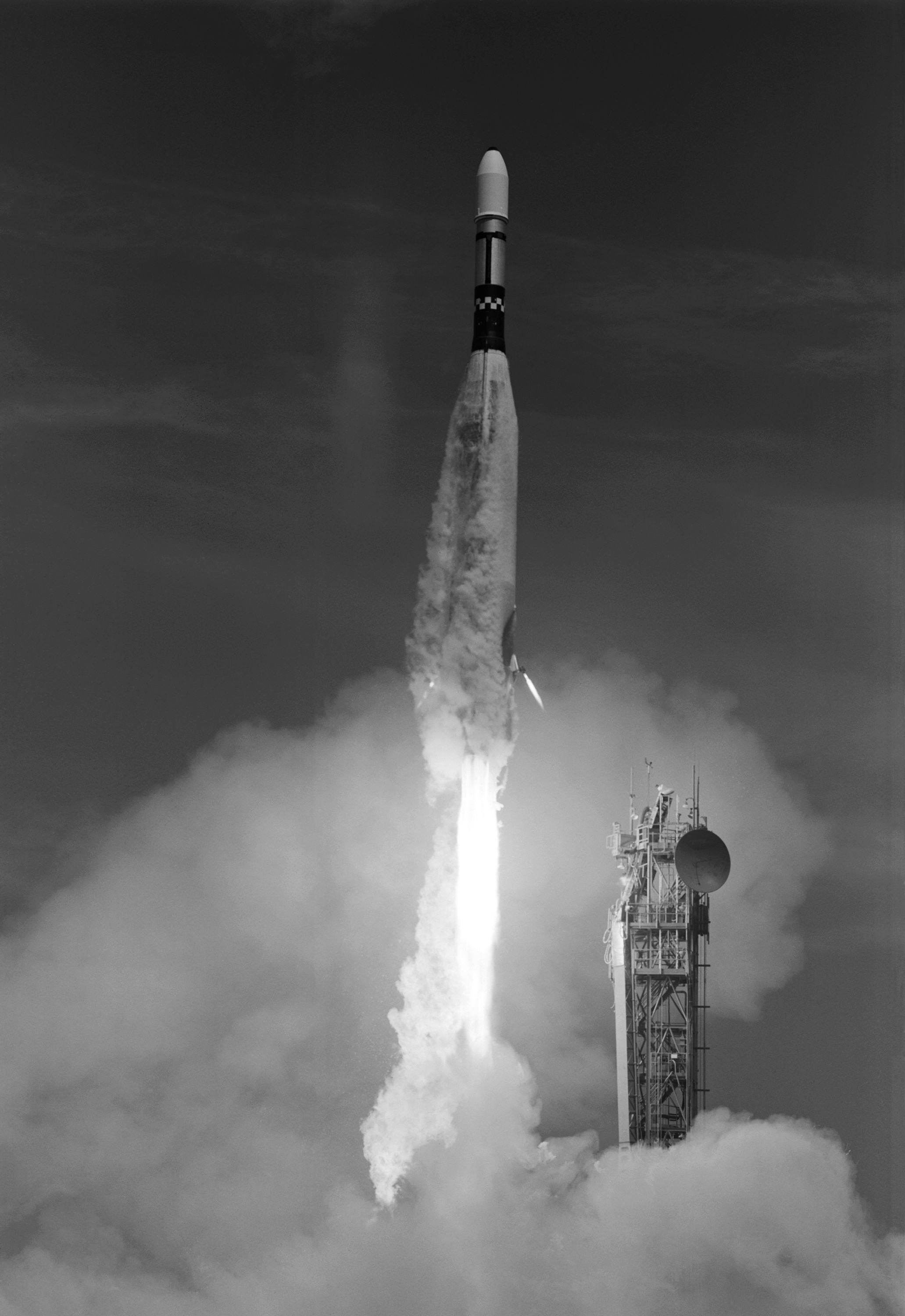
Launch of Lunar Orbiter 1 from an Atlas-Agena rocket on August 10, 1966

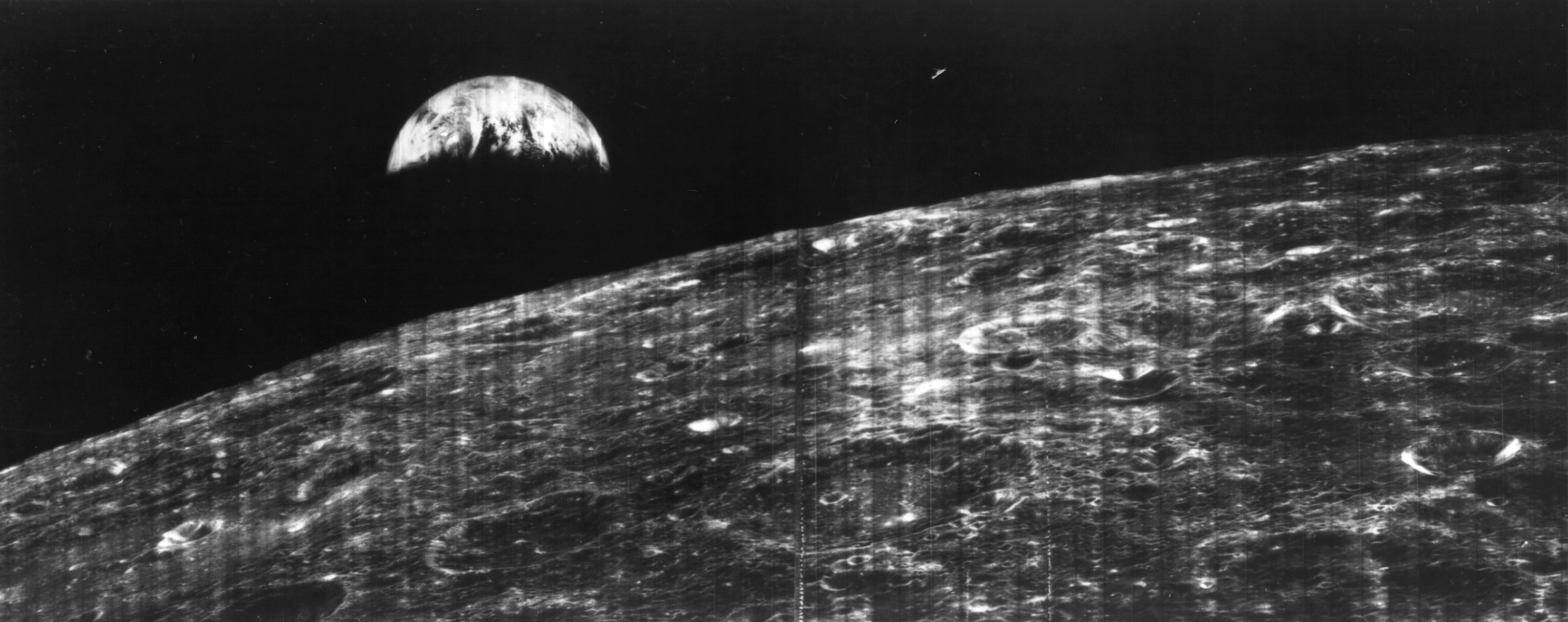
The first image of Earth from the distance of the Moon, August 23, 1966. The image (frame 1102; image 102 of Lunar Orbiter 1) consists of three parts h1-h3. Since its original publication its raw analog data has been used to digitally produce the image in higher resolution and clarity (see below). This probe took a second such image on August 25.

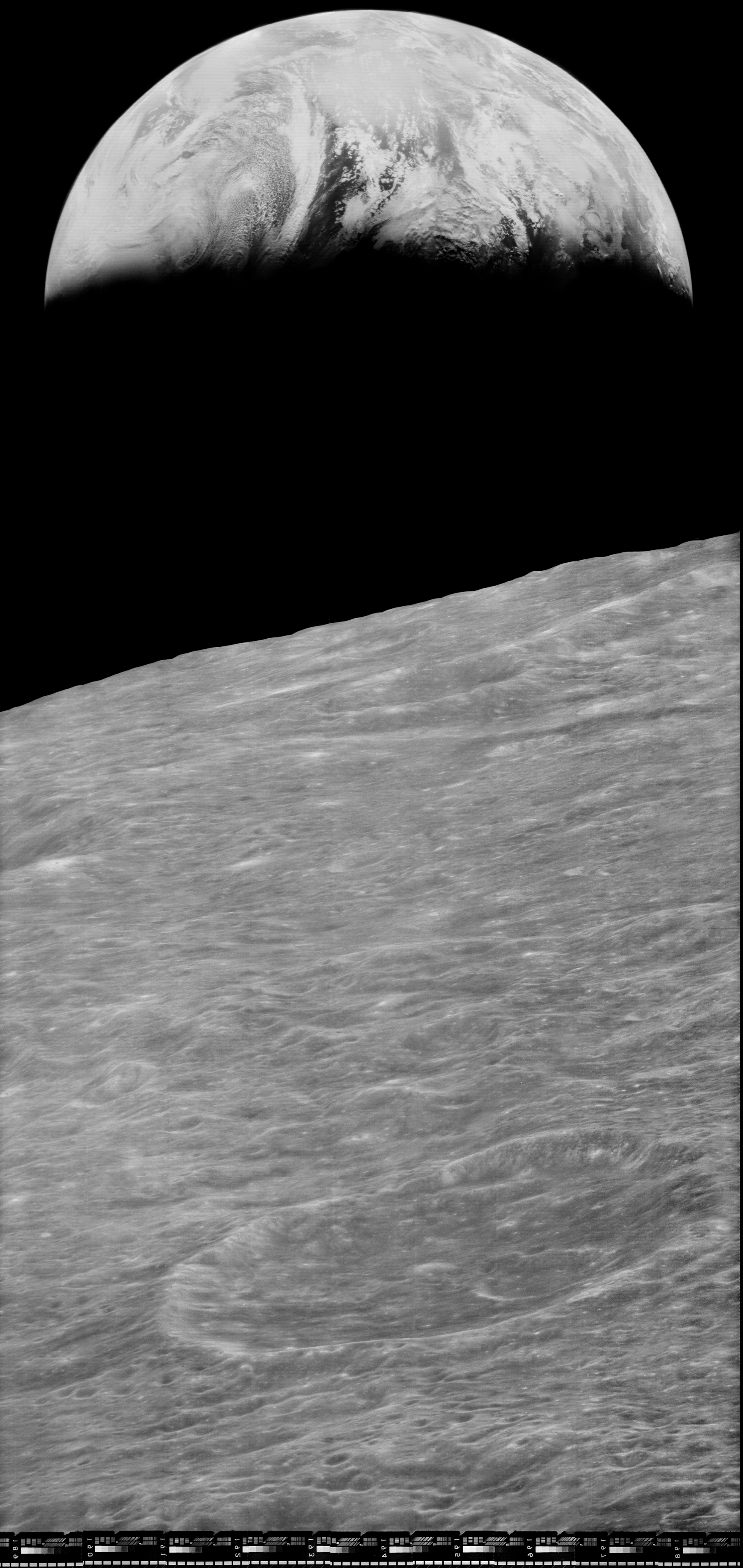
Part of the photo to the left as reprocessed by LOIRP in 2008.

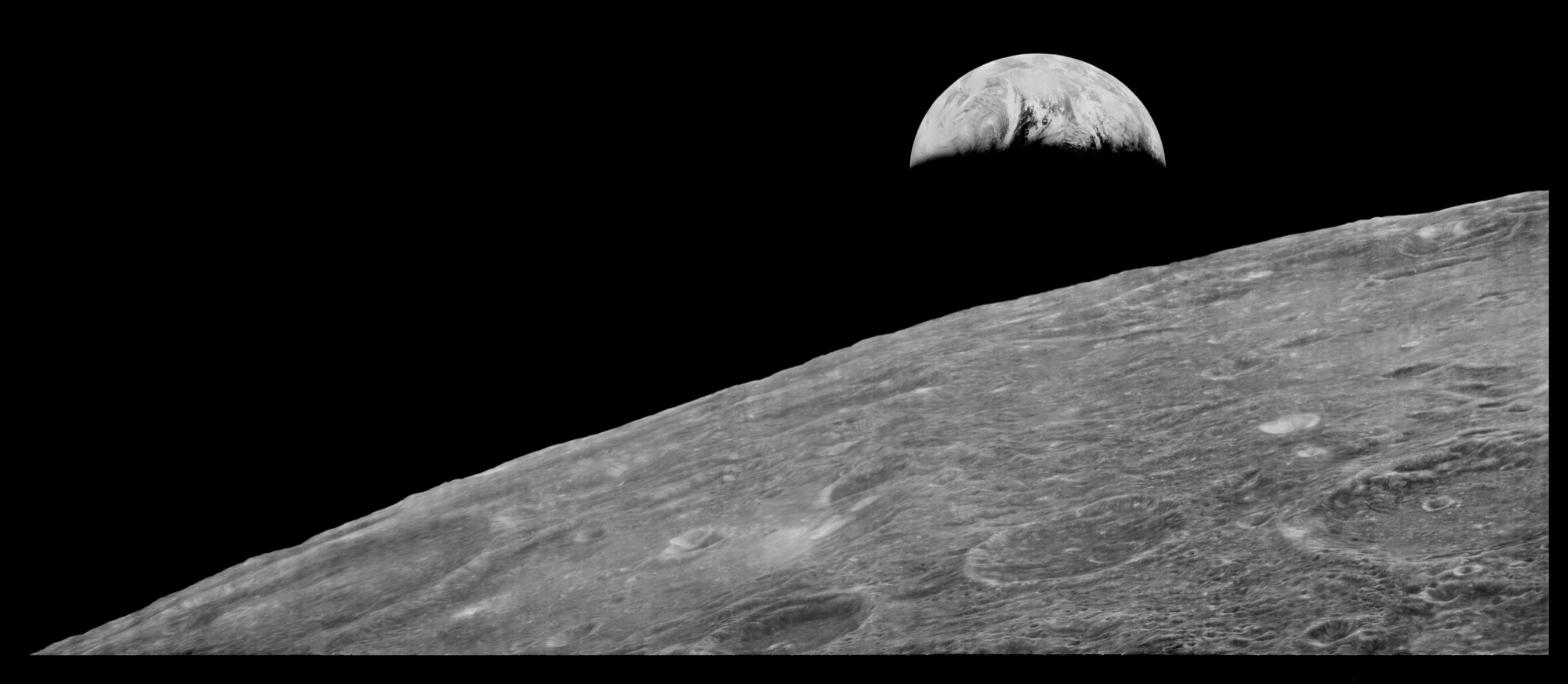
Full reprocessed image from 2008.

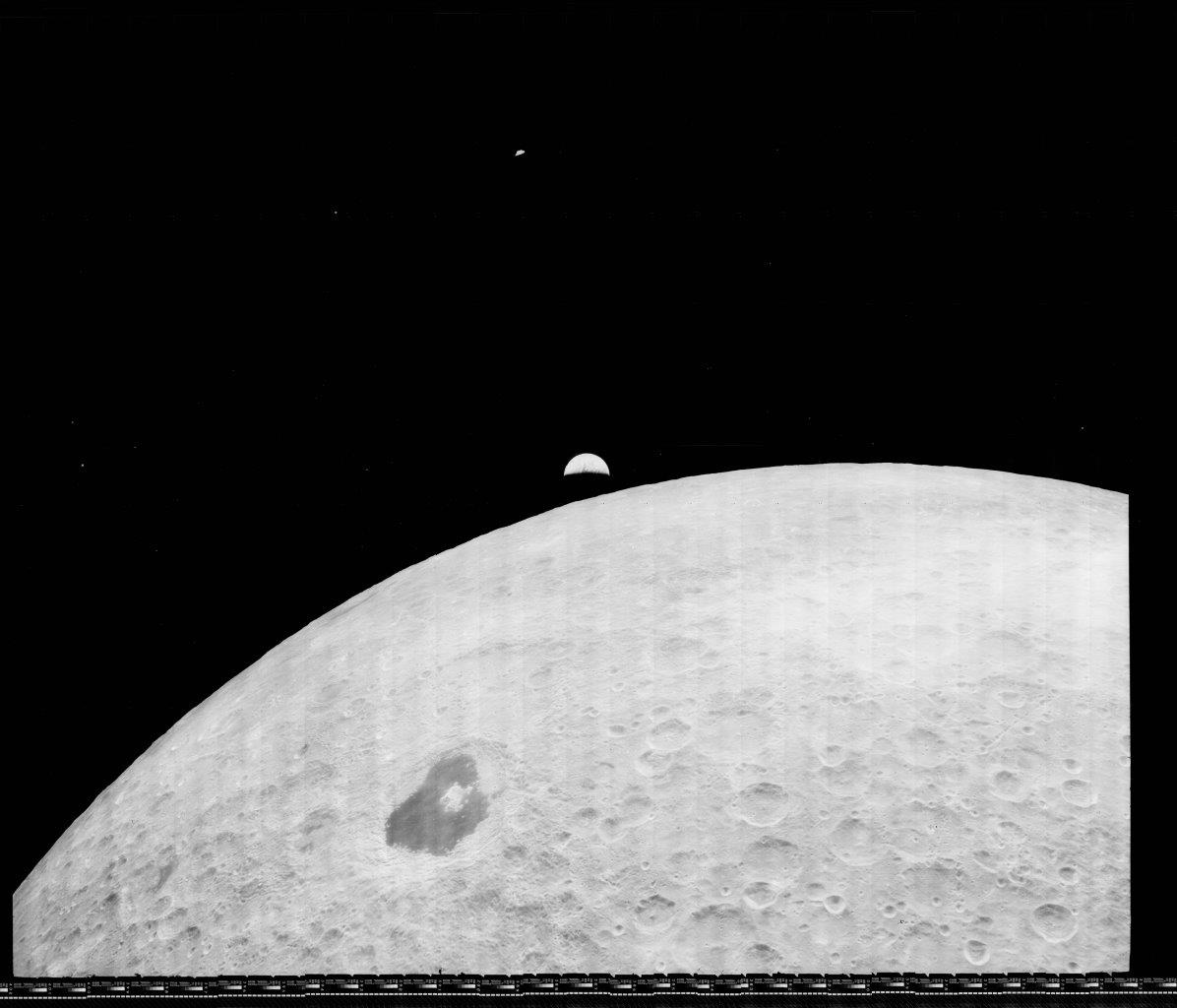
Wide angle frame 1102-m image

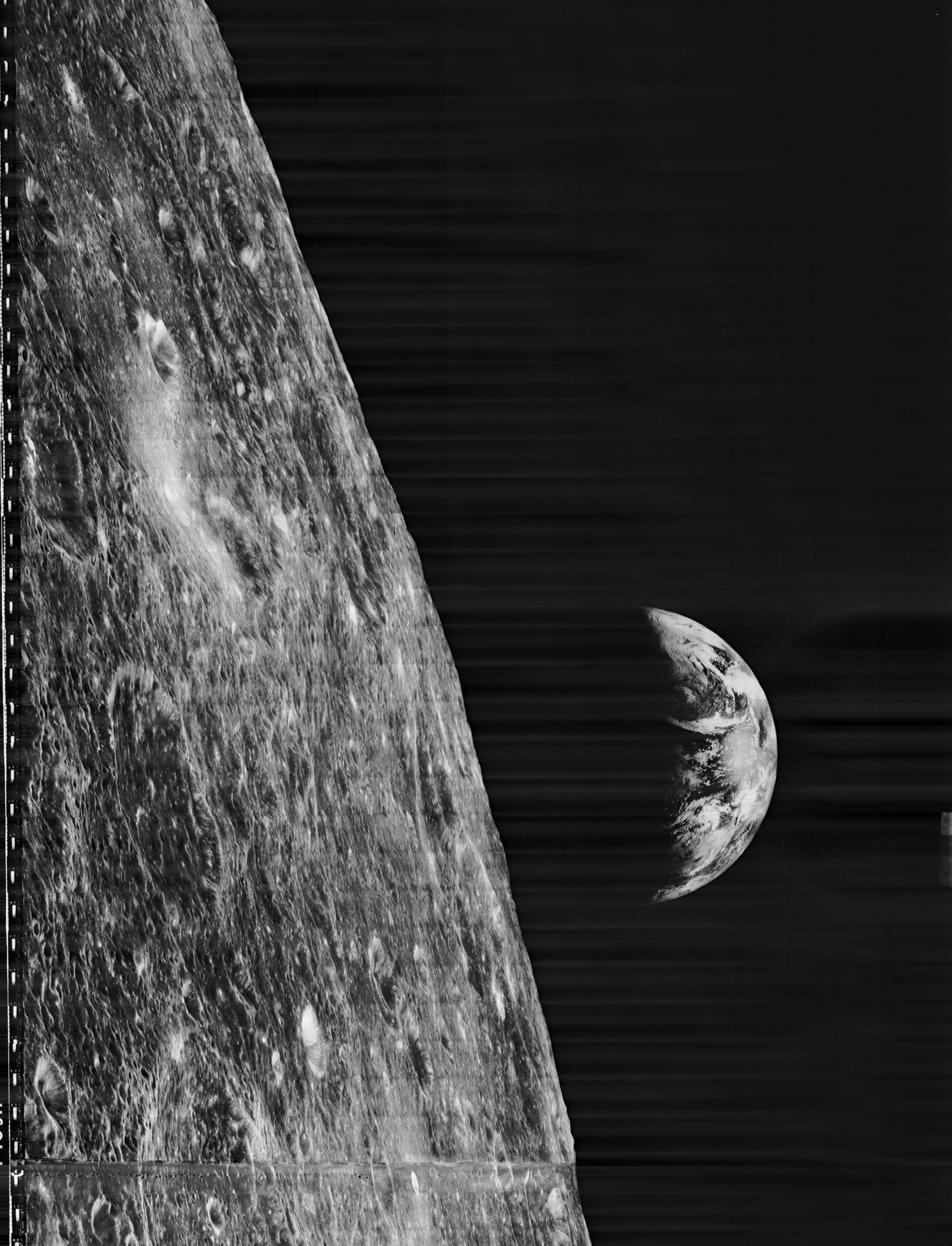
Central 1102-h image.

== See also ==
- Lunar Orbiter Image Recovery Project
- Exploration of the Moon
- List of artificial objects on the Moon
- List of missions to the Moon
  - Lunar Orbiter 2
  - Lunar Orbiter 3
  - Lunar Orbiter 4
  - Lunar Orbiter 5
- Lunar Orbiter 1 sequence of images 157, 158, and 159, showing the Apollo 12 landing site and vicinity
