= Lunar Orbiter 2 =

NASA orbiter mission to the Moon (1966–1967)

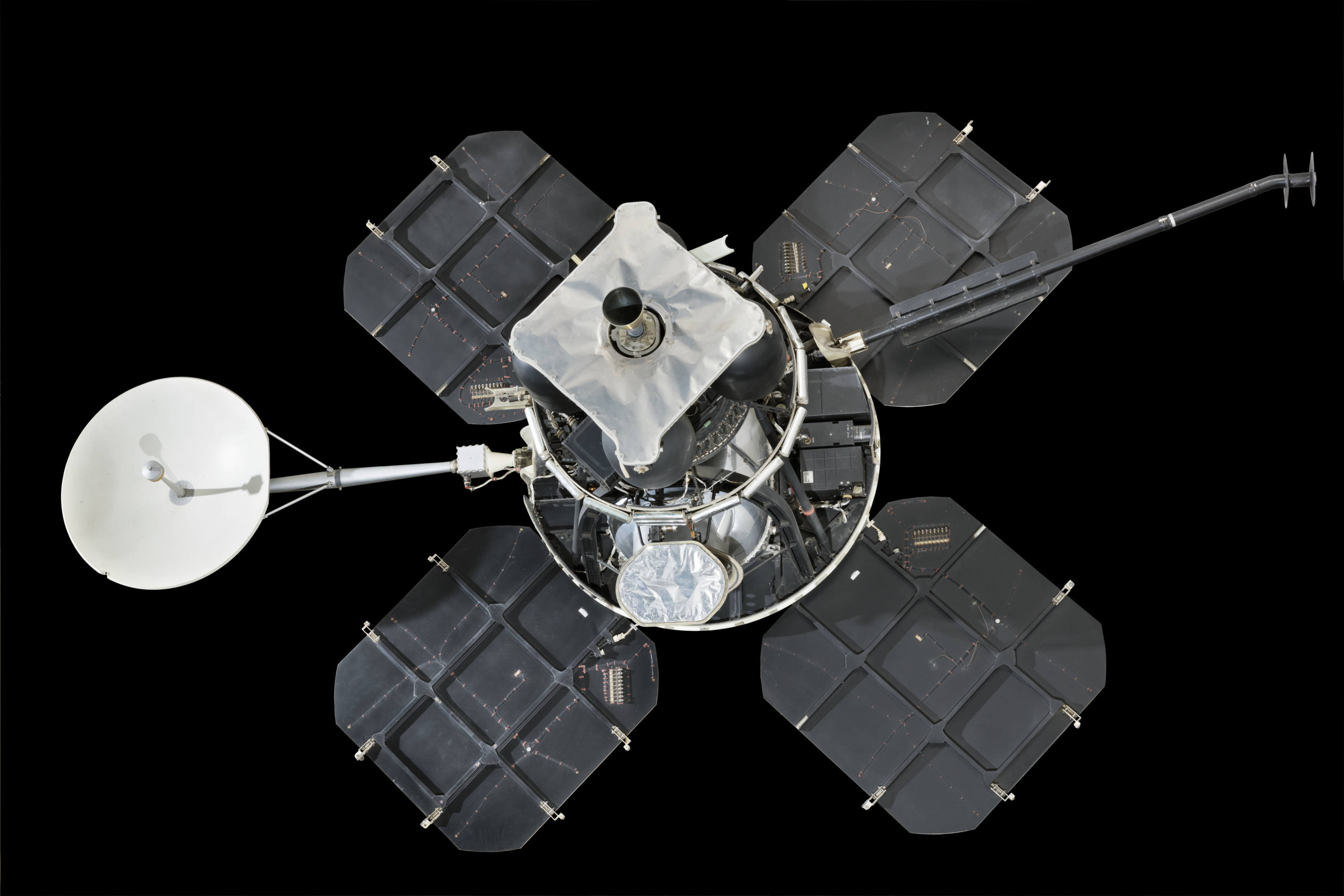
- Replica of a Lunar Orbiter spacecraft
- Mission type: Lunar orbiter
- Operator: NASA
- COSPAR ID: 1966-100A
- SATCAT no.: 2534
- Website: science.nasa.gov
- Mission duration: 11 months, 5 days

Spacecraft properties
- Manufacturer: Langley Research Center
- Launch mass: 385.6 kg (850 lb)
- Dimensions: 3.72 × 1.65 × 1.5 m (12.2 × 5.4 × 4.9 ft)
- Power: 375 watts

Start of mission
- Launch date: November 6, 1966, 23:21:00 UTC
- Rocket: Atlas SLV-3 Agena-D
- Launch site: Cape Canaveral LC-13

End of mission
- Disposal: Deorbited
- Decay date: October 11, 1967, 07:12:54 UTC

Orbital parameters
- Reference system: Selenocentric
- Longitude: 341.8 Degrees
- Semi-major axis: 2,694 km (1,674 mi)
- Eccentricity: 0.304
- Periselene altitude: 202 km (126 mi)
- Aposelene altitude: 1,871.3 km (1,162.8 mi)
- Inclination: 11.94 degrees
- Period: 3 hours, 28 minutes, 25 seconds
- Argument of periselene: 161.6 Degrees
- Epoch: November 9, 1966, 19:00:00 UTC

Lunar orbiter
- Orbital insertion: November 10, 1966
- Impact site: 3.0°N 119.1°E
- Orbits: 2,346

Transponders
- Frequency: 2295 MHz
Instruments
- -: Cesium Iodide Dosimeters
- -: Lunar Photographic Studies
- -: Meteoroid Detectors
- -: Selenodesy

The 1966 Lunar Orbiter 2 robotic spacecraft mission, part of the Lunar Orbiter Program, was designed primarily to photograph smooth areas of the lunar surface for selection and verification of safe landing sites for the Surveyor and Apollo missions. It was also equipped to collect selenodetic, radiation intensity, and micrometeoroid impact data.

== Mission summary ==
The spacecraft was placed in a cislunar trajectory and injected into an elliptical near-equatorial lunar orbit for data acquisition after 92.6 hours' flight time. The initial orbit was 196 by 1,850 kilometres (122 mi × 1,150 mi) at an inclination of 11.8 degrees. The perilune was lowered to 49.7 kilometres (30.9 mi) five days later after 33 orbits. A failure of the amplifier on the final day of readout, December 7, resulted in the loss of six photographs. On December 8, 1966 the inclination was altered to 17.5 degrees to provide new data on lunar gravity.

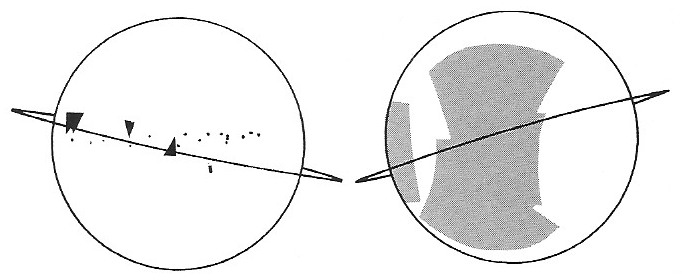
Spacecraft orbit and photographic coverage on the near side (left) and far side (right)

The spacecraft acquired photographic data from November 18 to 25, 1966, and readout occurred through December 7, 1966. A total of 609 high-resolution and 208 medium-resolution frames were returned, most of excellent quality with resolutions down to 1 metre (3 ft 3 in). These included a spectacular oblique picture of Copernicus crater, which was dubbed by the news media as one of the great pictures of the century. The photo was taken on the 23rd November at an altitude of 45km. Accurate data were acquired from all other experiments throughout the mission. Three micrometeorite impacts were recorded. The spacecraft was used for tracking purposes until it impacted upon the lunar surface on command at 3.0 degrees N latitude, 119.1 degrees E longitude (selenographic coordinates) on October 11, 1967.

In 2011, NASA's Lunar Reconnaissance Orbiter Camera (LROC) was able to locate and image the precise impact point of the spacecraft. The debris from an impact angle of 45 degrees or more spreads out like butterfly wings.

Instruments
| Lunar Photographic Studies | Evaluation of Apollo and Surveyor landing sites |
| Meteoroid Detectors | Detection of micrometeoroids in the lunar environment |
| Caesium Iodide Dosimeters | Radiation environment en route to and near the Moon |
| Selenodesy | Gravitational field and physical properties of the Moon |

Near Ariadaeus B crater on November 19, 1966 (4.83°N 15.53°E)

Area east of Gambart crater on November 23, 1966 (1.07°N 12.45°W)

Part of Mare Insularum, southwest of Kunowsky crater, on November 24, 1966 (1.87°N 33.79°W)

== See also ==
- Lunar Orbiter Image Recovery Project
- Exploration of the Moon
- List of artificial objects on the Moon
- List of missions to the Moon
  - Lunar Orbiter 1
  - Lunar Orbiter 3
  - Lunar Orbiter 4
  - Lunar Orbiter 5
