= Lunar Orbiter program =

Series of five uncrewed lunar orbiter missions

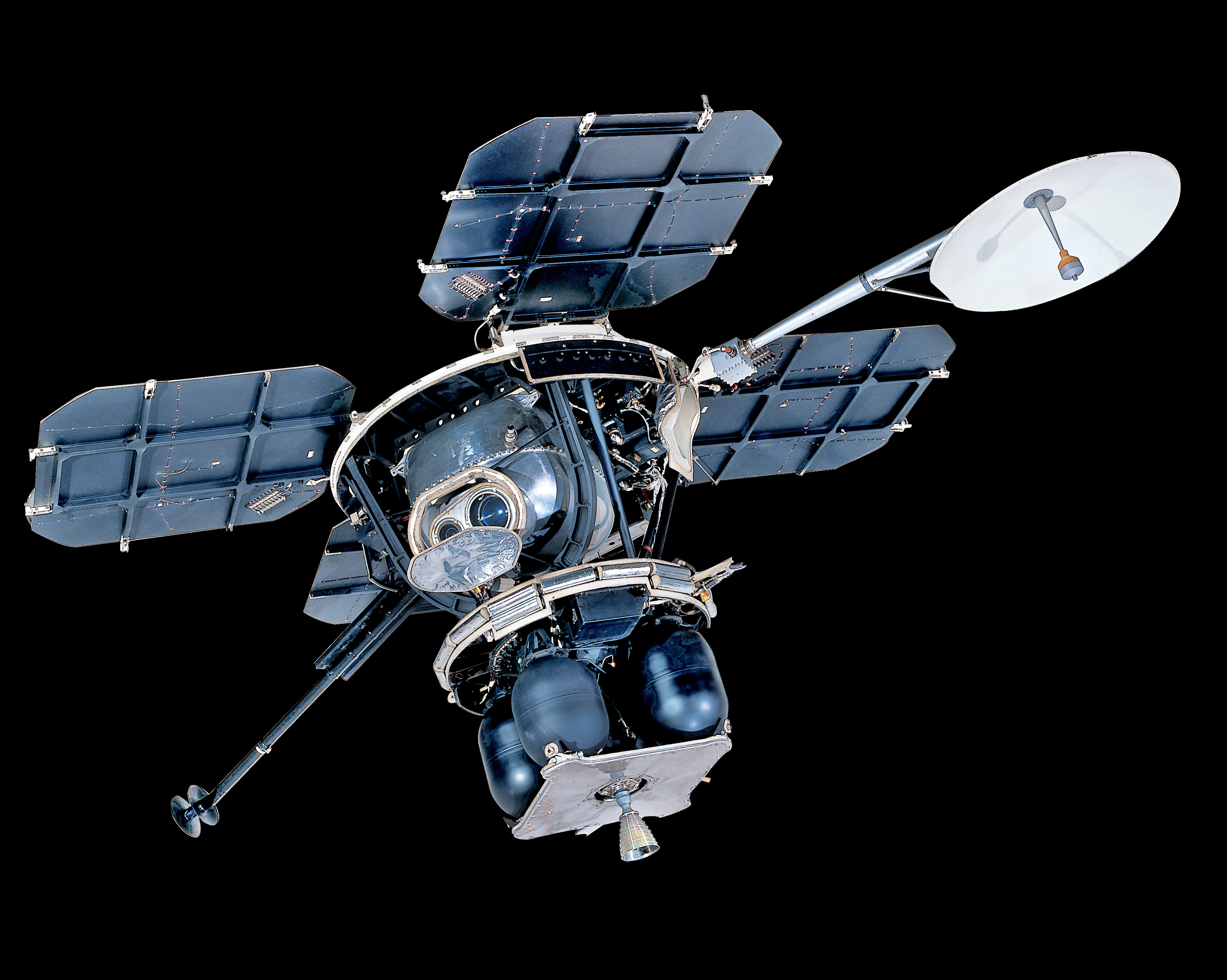
Lunar Orbiter spacecraft

The Lunar Orbiter program was a series of five uncrewed Moon-orbiting missions launched by the United States in 1966 and 1967. Intended to help select Apollo landing sites by mapping the Moon's surface, they provided the first photographs from lunar orbit and photographed both the Moon and Earth.

All five missions were successful, and 99 percent of the lunar surface was mapped from photographs taken with a resolution of 60 meters (200 ft) or better. The first three missions were dedicated to imaging 20 potential crewed lunar landing sites, selected based on Earth-based observations. These were flown at low-inclination orbits. The fourth and fifth missions were devoted to broader scientific objectives and were flown in high-altitude polar orbits. Lunar Orbiter 4 photographed the entire nearside and nine percent of the far side, and Lunar Orbiter 5 completed the far side coverage and acquired medium (20 m or 66 ft) and high (2 m or 6 ft 7 in) resolution images of 36 preselected areas. All of the Lunar Orbiter spacecraft were launched by Atlas-Agena-D launch vehicles.

The Lunar Orbiters had an imaging system which consisted of a dual-lens camera, a film processing unit, a readout scanner, and a film handling apparatus. Both lenses, a 610 mm (24 in) narrow angle high resolution (HR) lens and an 80 mm (3.1 in) wide angle medium resolution (MR) lens, placed their frame exposures on a single roll of 70 mm film. The axes of the two cameras were coincident so the area imaged in the HR frames were centered within the MR frame areas. The film was moved during exposure to compensate for the spacecraft velocity, which was estimated by an electro-optical sensor. The film was then processed, scanned, and the images transmitted back to Earth.

During the Lunar Orbiter missions, the first pictures of Earth as a whole were taken, beginning with Earth-rise over the lunar surface by Lunar Orbiter 1 in August, 1966. The first full picture of the whole Earth was taken by Lunar Orbiter 5 on 8 August 1967. A second photo of the whole Earth was taken by Lunar Orbiter 5 on 10 November 1967.

== Spacecraft and subsystems ==
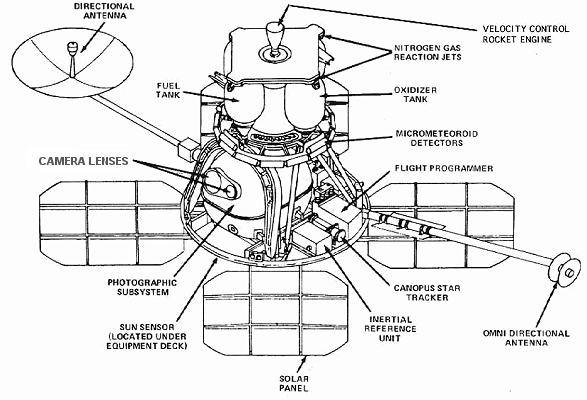
Lunar Orbiter diagram (NASA)

The Boeing-Eastman Kodak proposal was announced by NASA on 20 December 1963. The main bus of the Lunar Orbiter had the general shape of a truncated cone, 1.65 m (5 ft 5 in) tall and 1.5 m (4 ft 11 in) in diameter at the base. The spacecraft was composed of three decks supported by trusses and an arch. The equipment deck at the base of the craft held the battery, transponder, flight programmer, inertial reference unit (IRU), Canopus star tracker, command decoder, multiplex encoder, traveling-wave tube amplifier (TWTA), and the photographic system. Four solar panels were mounted to extend out from this deck with a total span across of 3.72 m (12.2 ft). Also extending out from the base of the spacecraft were a high gain antenna on a 1.32 m (4 ft 4 in) boom and a low-gain antenna on a 2.08 m (6 ft 10 in) boom. Above the equipment deck, the middle deck held the velocity control engine, propellant, oxidizer, and pressurization tanks, Sun sensors, and micrometeoroid detectors. The third deck consisted of a heat shield to protect the spacecraft from the firing of the velocity control engine. The nozzle of the engine protruded through the center of the shield. Mounted on the perimeter of the top deck were four attitude control thrusters.

Power of 375 W was provided by the four solar arrays containing 10,856 n/p solar cells which would directly run the spacecraft and also charge the 12 A·h nickel-cadmium battery. The batteries were used during the brief periods of occultation when no solar power was available. Propulsion for major maneuvers was provided by the gimballed velocity control engine, a hypergolic 440 newtons (100 lbf) thrust Marquardt Corp. rocket motor. Three-axis stabilization and attitude control were provided by four 4 newtons (1 lbf) nitrogen gas jets. Navigational knowledge was provided by five Sun sensors, the Canopus star sensor, and the inertial navigation system. Communications were via a 10 W transmitter and the directional one-meter diameter high-gain antenna for transmission of photographs, and a 0.5 W transmitter and omnidirectional low-gain antenna for other communications. Both transmitters operated in the S band at about 2295 MHz. Thermal control was maintained by a multilayer aluminized Mylar and Dacron thermal blanket which enshrouded the main bus, special paint, insulation, and small heaters.

Originally, the Air Force had offered NASA several spare cameras from the KH-7 GAMBIT program, but then authorities became concerned over security surrounding the classified cameras, including the possibility of images of the Moon giving away their resolution. Some proposals were made that NASA not publish the orbital parameters of the Lunar Orbiter probes so that the resolution of the images could not be calculated through their altitude. In the end, NASA's existing camera systems, while lower resolution, proved to be adequate for the needs of the mission.

=== Photographic subsystem ===
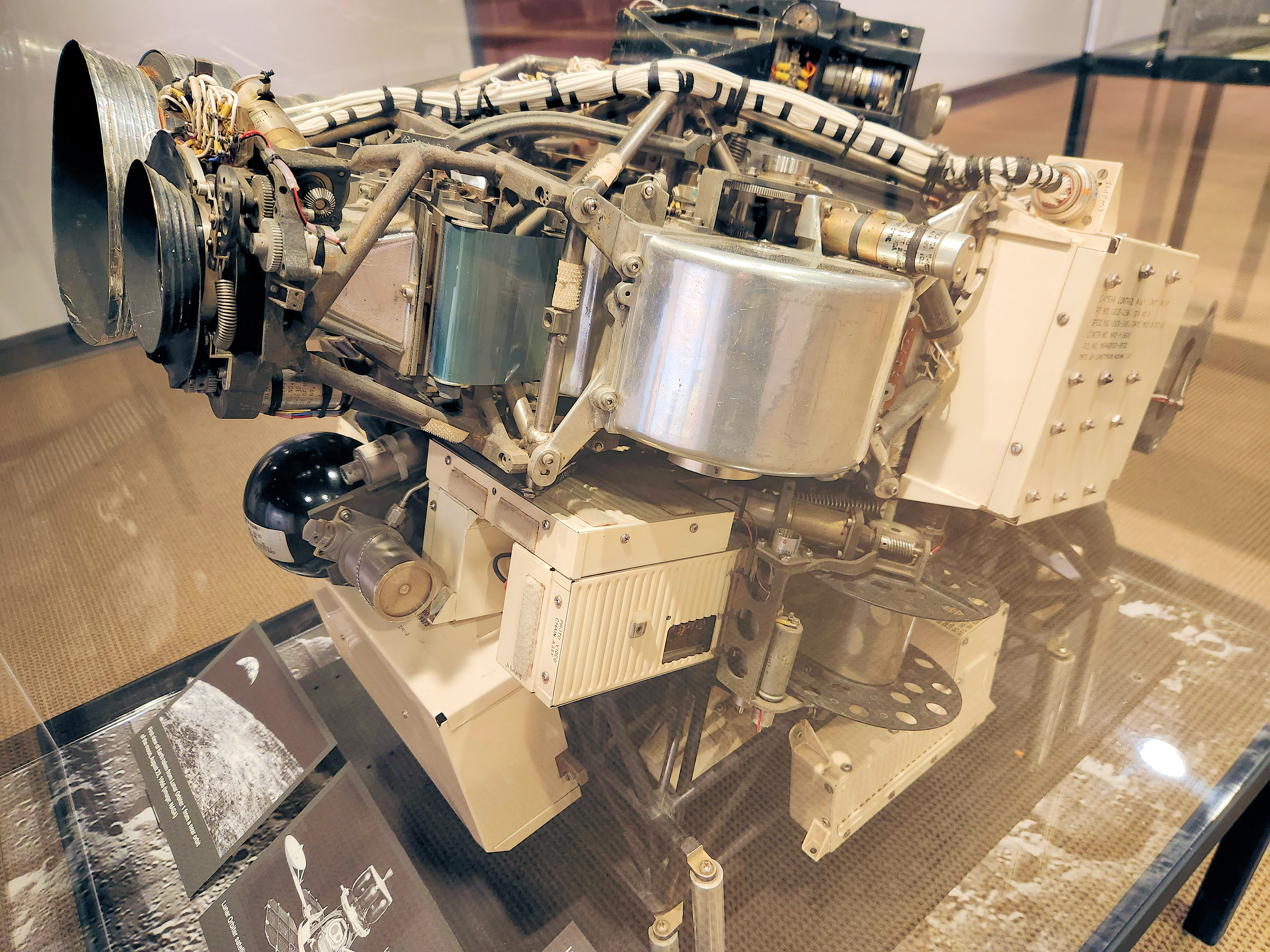
A flight-spare Lunar Orbiter Photographic Subsystem is on display at the George Eastman Museum in Rochester, N.Y.

Kodak created and constructed eight photographic subsystems for the Lunar Orbiter program, five of which were used in space missions of 1966 and 1967. The camera used two lenses to simultaneously expose a wide-angle and a high-resolution image on the same film. The wide-angle, medium resolution mode used an 80 mm F 2.8 Xenotar lens manufactured by Schneider Kreuznach of West Germany. The high-resolution mode used a 610 mm F 5.6 Panoramic lens manufactured by the Pacific Optical Company. The cameras exposed negatives on 65 mm Kodak Bimat film, which was then developed onboard using a semidry process. The subsystem's photomultiplier then scanned the images for transmission to Earth as analog video. The receiving stations on Earth then transferred the video images back onto film, which was then shipped to Kodak in Rochester for final processing and printing. This system was adapted under permission of the NRO from the SAMOS E-1 reconnaissance camera, built by Kodak for a short-lived USAF near-realtime satellite imaging project.

=== Potential backup ===
As a backup for the Lunar Orbiter program, NASA and the NRO cooperated on the Lunar Mapping and Survey System (LM&SS), based on the KH-7 reconnaissance satellite. Replacing the Lunar Module in the Saturn V, Apollo astronauts would operate LM&SS remotely in lunar orbit. NASA canceled the project in the summer of 1967 after the complete success of the Lunar Orbiters.

Engineering mock-up in the National Air and Space Museum

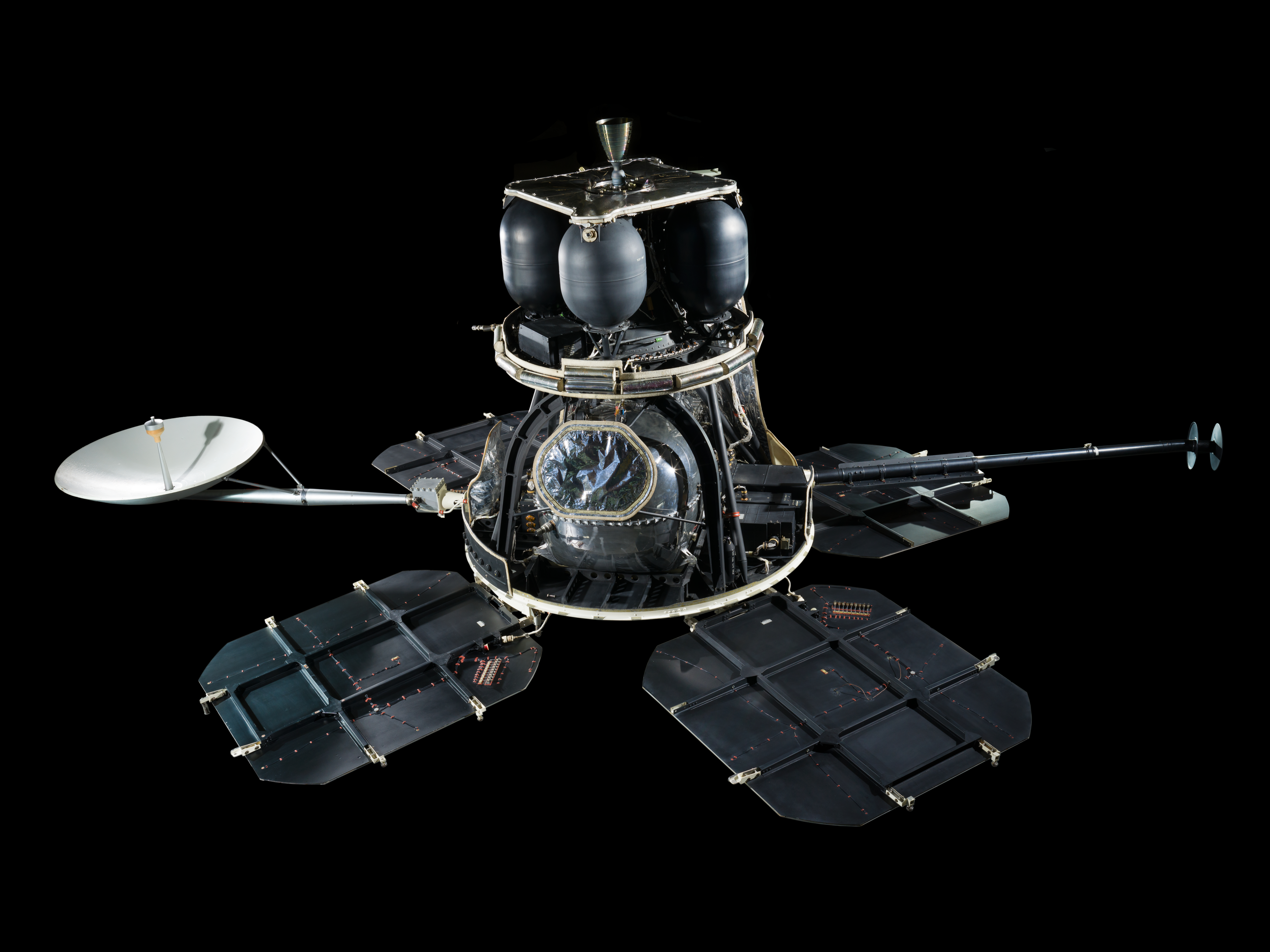

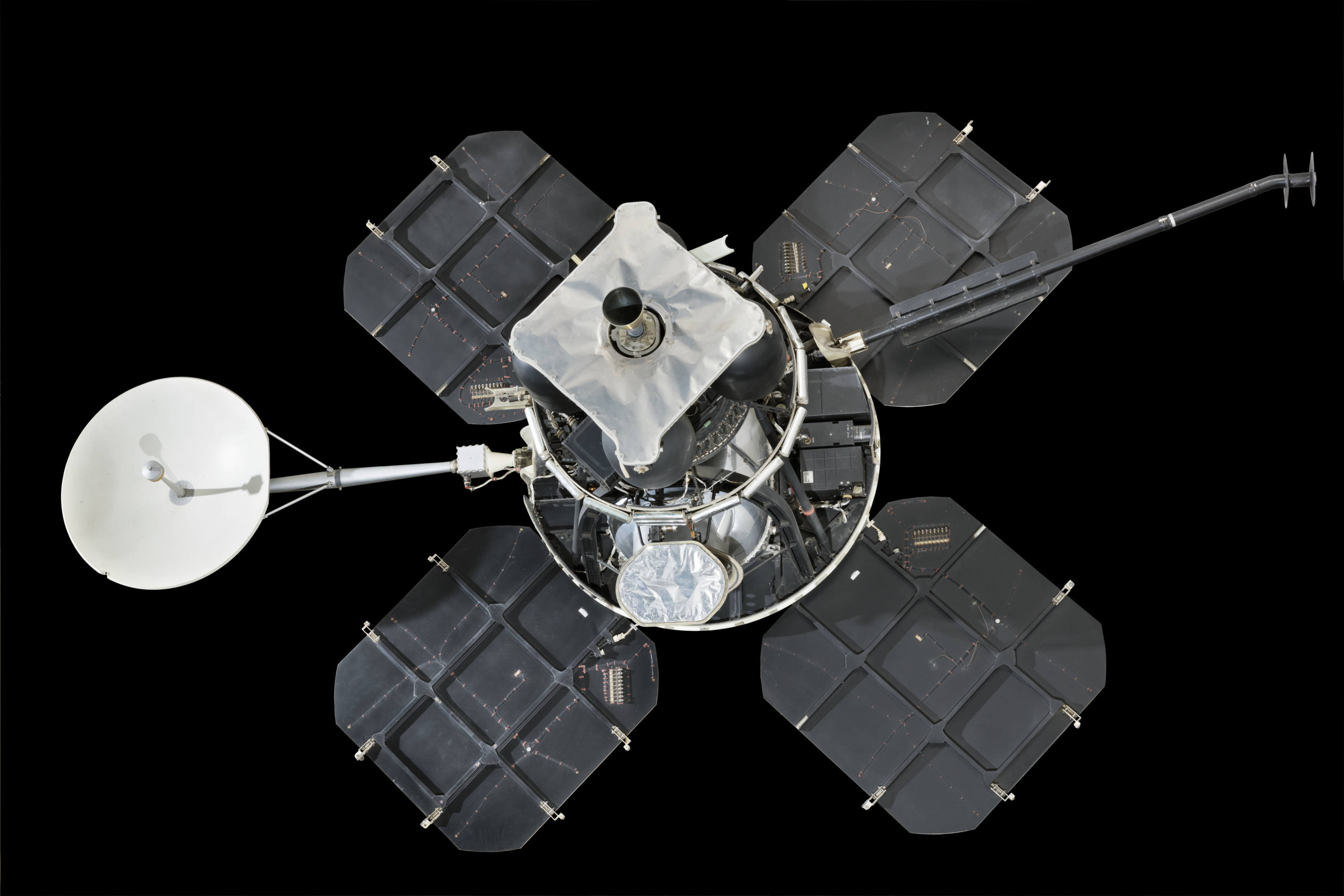

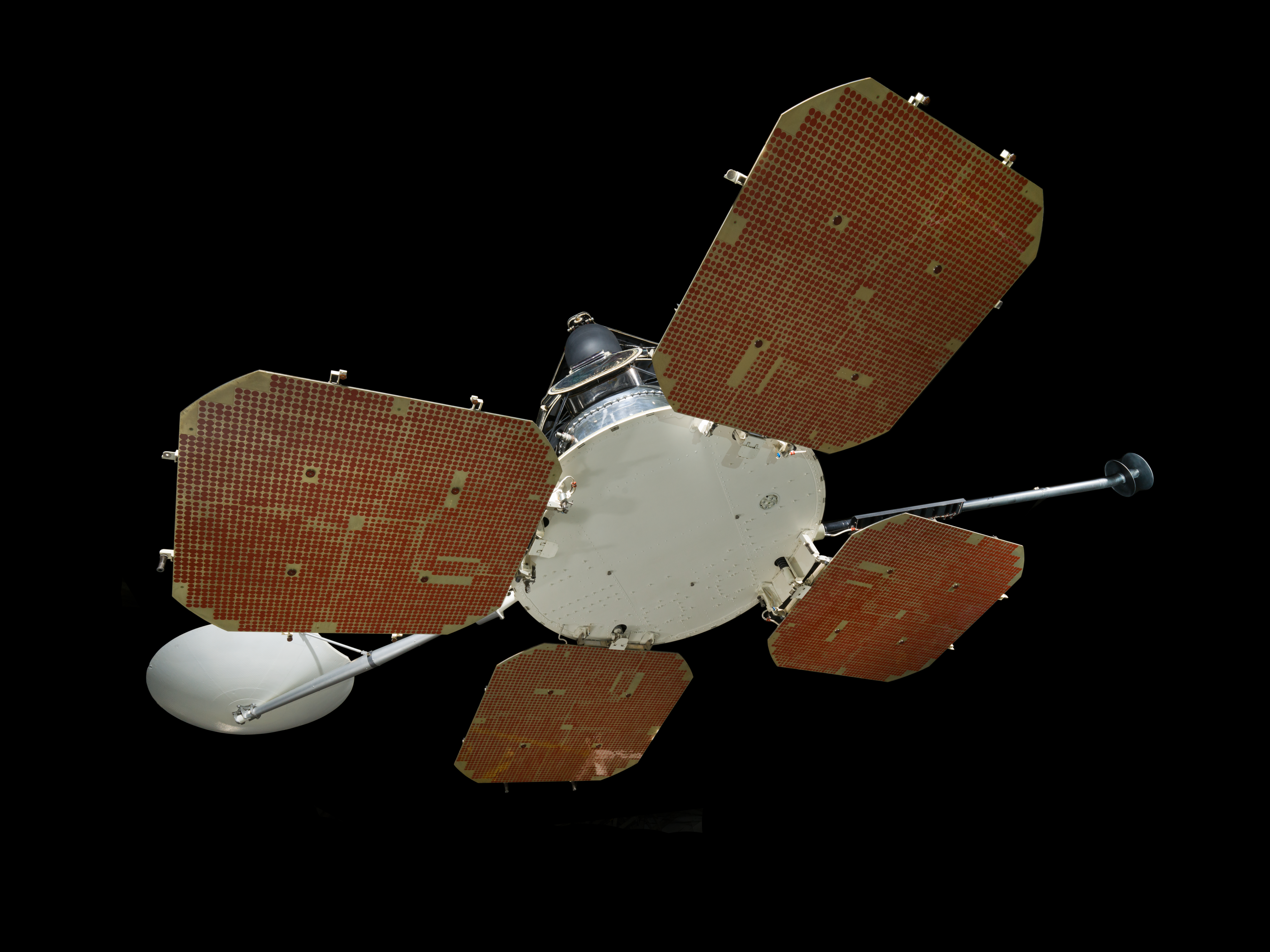

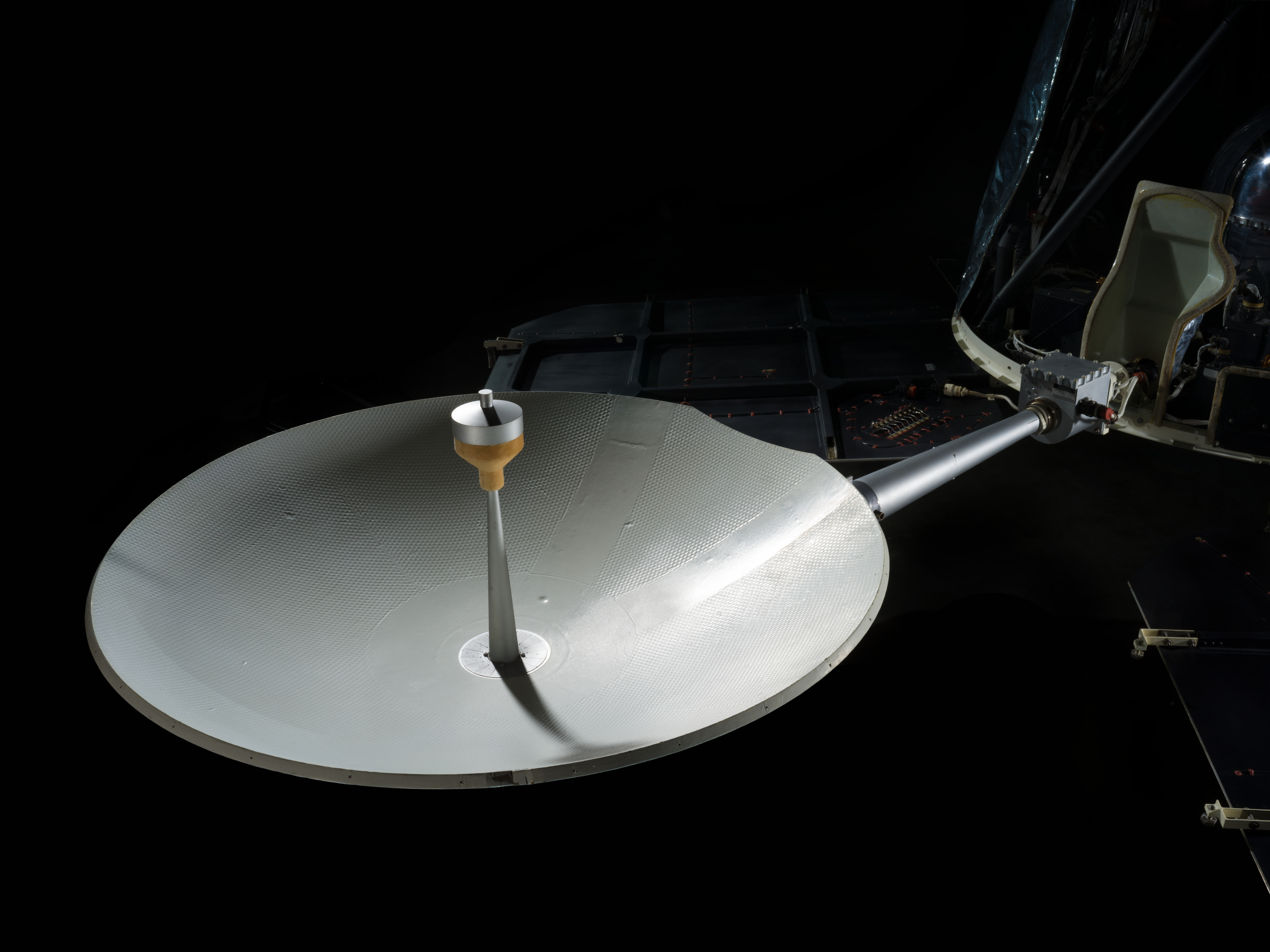

== Results ==
The Lunar Orbiter program consisted of five spacecraft which returned photography of 99 percent of the surface of the Moon (near and far side) with resolution down to 1 meter (3 ft 3 in). Altogether the Orbiters returned 2180 high resolution and 882 medium resolution frames. The micrometeoroid experiments recorded 22 impacts showing the average micrometeoroid flux near the Moon was about two orders of magnitude greater than in interplanetary space, but slightly less than in the near-Earth environment. The radiation experiments confirmed that the design of Apollo hardware would protect the astronauts from average and greater than average short term exposure to solar particle events.

The use of Lunar Orbiters for tracking to evaluate the Manned Space Flight Network tracking stations and Apollo Orbit Determination Program was successful, with three of the Lunar Orbiters (2, 3, and 5) being tracked simultaneously from August through October 1967. The Lunar Orbiters were all eventually commanded to crash on the Moon before their attitude control fuel ran out so they would not present navigational or communications hazards to later Apollo flights. The Lunar Orbiter program was managed by NASA Langley Research Center at a total cost of roughly $200 million.

Doppler tracking of the five orbiters allowed mapping of the gravitational field of the Moon and discovery of mass concentrations (mascons), or gravitational highs, which were located in the centers of some (but not all) of the lunar maria.

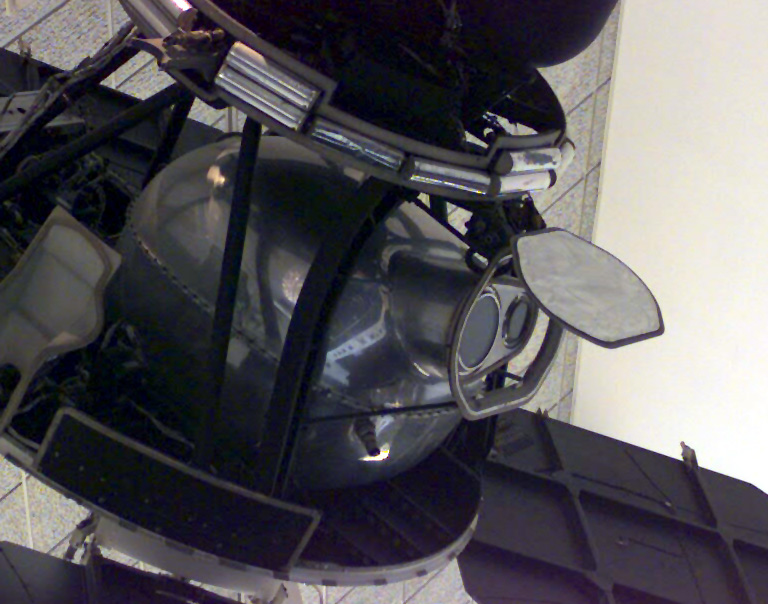
Lunar Orbiter camera (NASA)

Below is the flight log information of the five Lunar Orbiter photographic missions:

- Lunar Orbiter 1
  - Launched August 10, 1966
  - Imaged Moon: August 18 to 29, 1966
  - Impact with Moon: October 29, 1966
  - Apollo landing site survey mission
- Lunar Orbiter 2
  - Launched November 6, 1966
  - Imaged Moon: November 18 to 25, 1966
  - Impact with Moon: October 11, 1967
  - Apollo landing site survey mission
- Lunar Orbiter 3
  - Launched February 5, 1967
  - Imaged Moon: February 15 to 23, 1967
  - Impact with Moon: October 9, 1967
  - Apollo landing site survey mission
- Lunar Orbiter 4
  - Launched May 4, 1967
  - Imaged Moon: May 11 to 26, 1967
  - Impact with Moon: Approximately October 31, 1967
  - Lunar mapping mission
- Lunar Orbiter 5
  - Launched August 1, 1967
  - Imaged Moon: August 6 to 18, 1967
  - Impact with Moon: January 31, 1968
  - Lunar mapping and hi-res survey mission

=== Data availability ===
The Lunar Orbiter orbital photographs were transmitted to Earth as analog data after onboard scanning of the original film into a series of strips. The data were written to magnetic tape and also to film. The film data were used to create hand-made mosaics of Lunar Orbiter frames. Each LO exposure resulted in two photographs: medium-resolution frames recorded by the 80-mm focal-length lens and high-resolution frames recorded by the 610-mm focal length lens. Due to their large size, HR frames were divided into three sections, or sub-frames. Large-format prints (16 by 20 inches (410 mm × 510 mm)) from the mosaics were created and several copies were distributed across the U.S. to NASA image and data libraries known as Regional Planetary Information Facilities. The resulting outstanding views were of generally very high spatial resolution and covered a substantial portion of the lunar surface, but they suffered from a "venetian blind" striping, missing or duplicated data, and frequent saturation effects that hampered their use. For many years these images have been the basis of much of lunar scientific research. Because they were obtained at low to moderate Sun angles, the Lunar Orbiter photographic mosaics are particularly useful for studying the morphology of lunar topographic features.

Several atlases and books featuring Lunar Orbiter photographs have been published. Perhaps the most definitive was that of Bowker and Hughes (1971); it contained 675 photographic plates with approximately global coverage of the Moon. In part because of high interest in the data and in part because that atlas is out of print, the task was undertaken at the Lunar and Planetary Institute to scan the large-format prints of Lunar Orbiter data. These were made available online as the Digital Lunar Orbiter Photographic Atlas of the Moon.

=== Data recovery and digitization ===
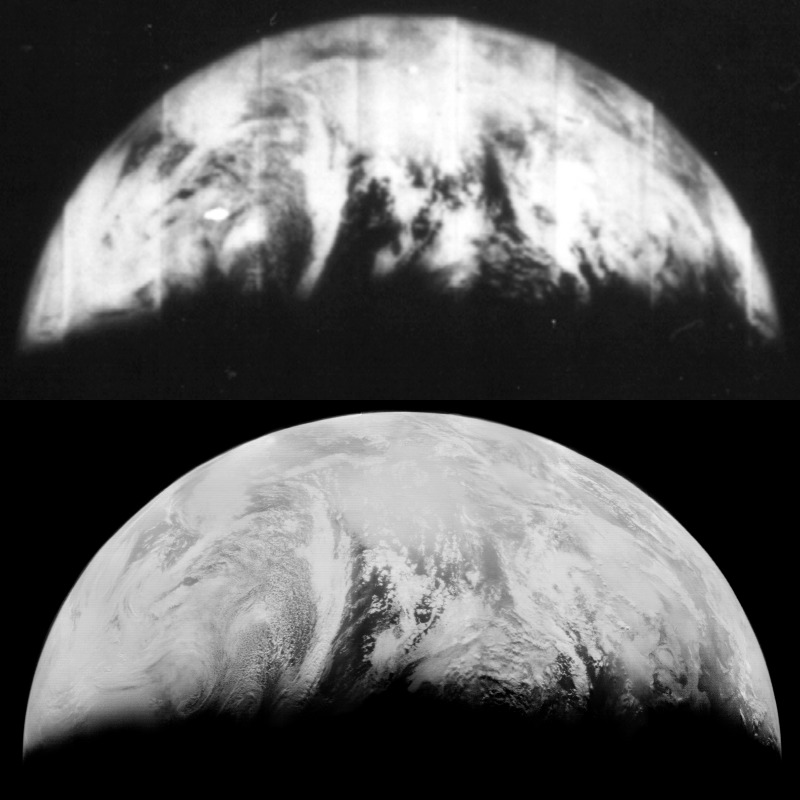
A detail of an original image at the top, compared to a reprocessed version at the bottom created by LOIRP.

In 2000, the Astrogeology Research Program of the US Geological Survey in Flagstaff, Arizona was funded by NASA (as part of the Lunar Orbiter Digitization Project) to scan at 25 micrometer resolution archival LO positive film strips that were produced from the original data. The goal was to produce a global mosaic of the Moon using the best available Lunar Orbiter frames (largely the same coverage as that of Bowker and Hughes, 1971). The frames were constructed from scanned film strips; they were digitally constructed, geometrically controlled, and map-projected without the stripes that had been noticeable in the original photographic frames. Because of its emphasis on construction of a global mosaic, this project only scanned about 15% of the available Lunar Orbiter photographic frames. Data from Lunar Orbiter missions III, IV and V were included in the global mosaic.

In addition, the USGS digitization project created frames from very high resolution Lunar Orbiter images for several 'sites of scientific interest.' These sites had been identified in the 1960s when the Apollo landing sites were being selected. Frames for sites such as the Apollo 12 landing site, the Marius Hills, and the Sulpicius Gallus rille have been released.

In 2007, the Lunar Orbiter Image Recovery Project (LOIRP) began a process to convert the Lunar Orbiter Images directly from the original Ampex FR-900 analog video recordings of the spacecraft data to digital image format, a change which provided vastly improved resolution over the original images released in the 1960s. The first of these restored images were released in late 2008. Almost all of the Lunar Orbiter images had been successfully recovered As of February 2014 and were undergoing digital processing before being submitted to NASA's Planetary Data System.

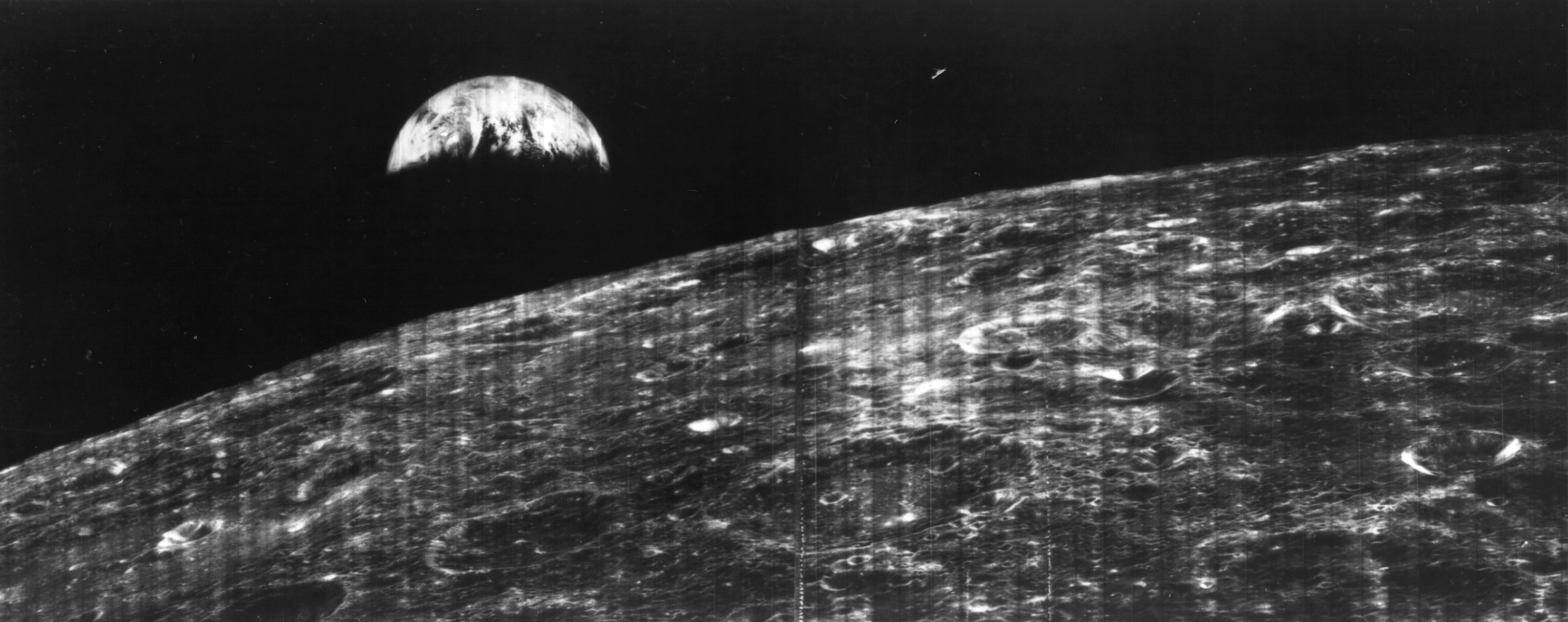
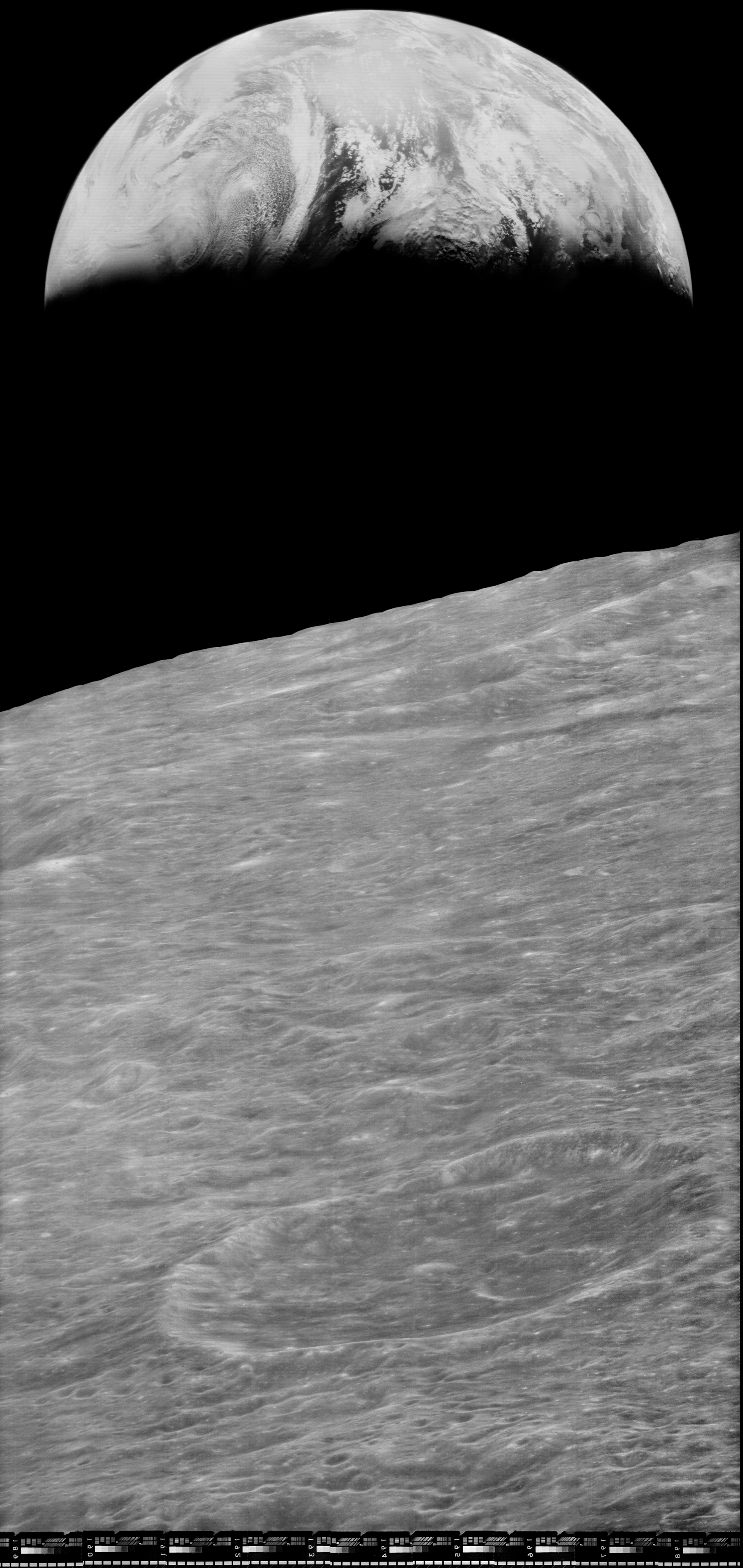
The first image of Earth taken from the Moon. On the left the original and on the right a digitally restored version created by LOIRP.

== See also ==
- Astrogeology Research Program
- Lunar Orbiter Image Recovery Project
- Lunar Reconnaissance Orbiter
- Ranger program
- Surveyor program
- Apollo program
- Luna programme
- Exploration of the Moon
- Robert J. Helberg
- Norman L. Crabill
- List of artificial objects on the Moon
- List of missions to the Moon
