= Lunar Orbiter Image Recovery Project =

Project to digitize and restore pictures taken by the Lunar Orbiter program

Coordinates: 37.4094°N 122.0548°W

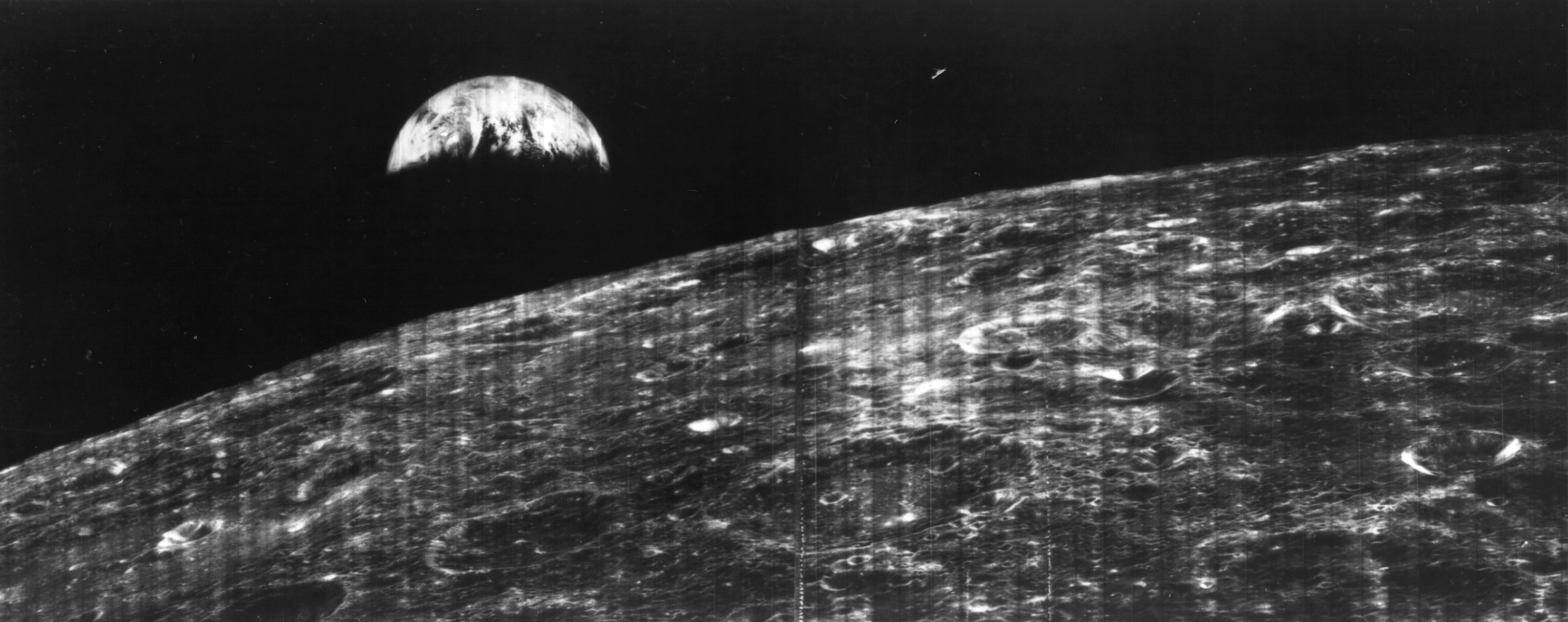
Earth taken from Lunar Orbiter 1 in 1966. Image as originally shown to the public displays extensive flaws and striping.

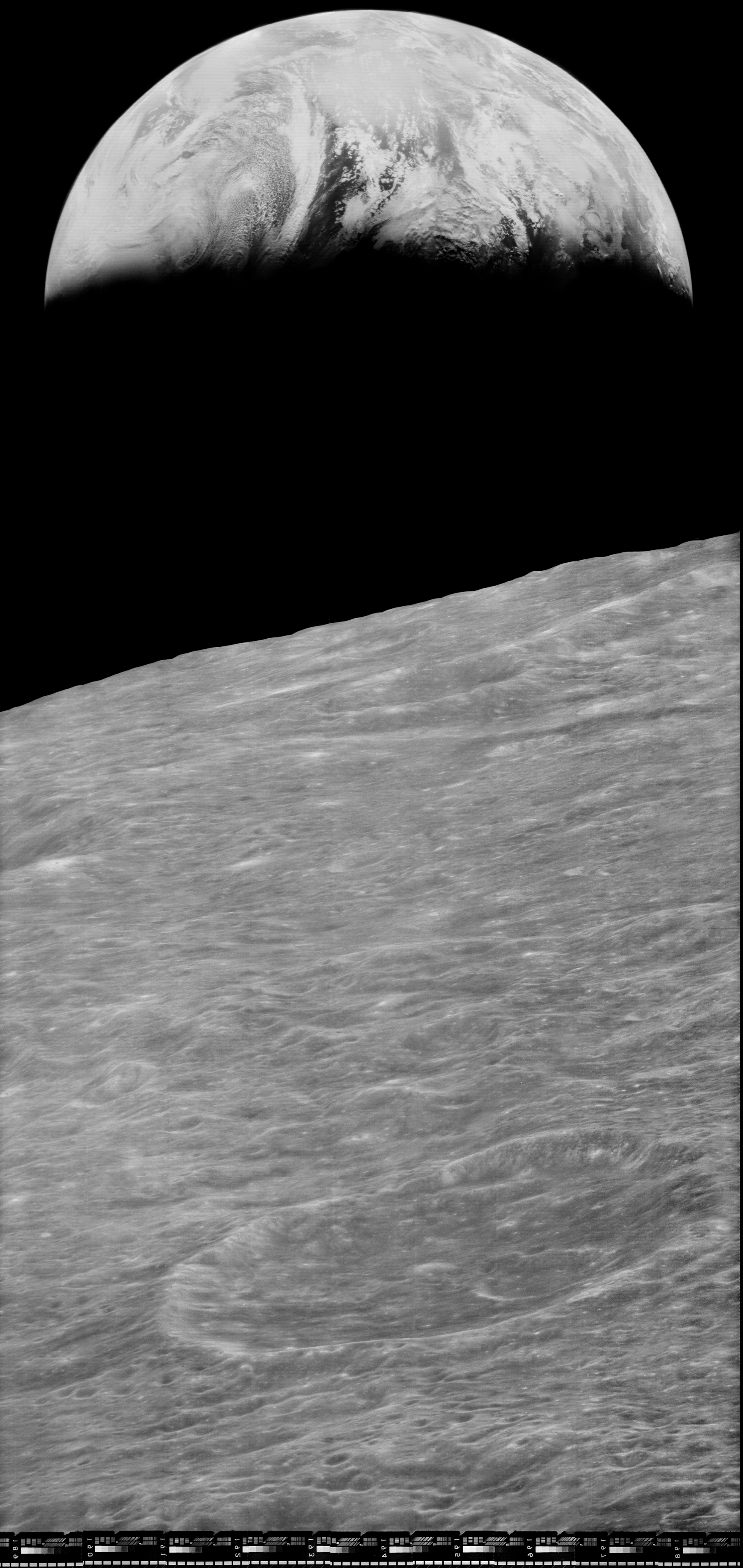
Earth taken from Lunar Orbiter 1 in 1966. This image shows the improvement in picture quality after capture and reprocessing by LOIRP.

The Lunar Orbiter Image Recovery Project (LOIRP) was a project to digitize the original analog data tapes from the five Lunar Orbiter spacecraft that were sent to the Moon in 1966 and 1967; it was funded by NASA, SkyCorp, SpaceRef Interactive, and private individuals.

The first image to be successfully recovered by the project was released in November 2008. It was the first photograph of the Earth from the Moon, taken in August 1966. On February 20, 2014, the project announced it had completed the primary tape capture portion of the project. One medium resolution image, most of one high resolution image and parts of three others are missing, apparently due to lapses at the time they were being recorded. The rest of the Lunar Orbiter images have been successfully recovered and have been published in NASA's Planetary Data System.

== Background ==
The images taken by the Lunar Orbiter spacecraft were primarily used to locate landing sites for the crewed Apollo missions. Once those missions were over, the data, on about 1,500 tapes, was largely forgotten since it had served its purpose. The original tapes were carefully archived for 20 years by the government in Maryland. When the tapes were released back to NASA's Jet Propulsion Laboratory (JPL) in Pasadena, California, in 1986, the decision of whether to scrap the tapes became the responsibility of JPL archivist Nancy Evans. She decided that the tapes should be preserved. She recalled, "I could not morally get rid of this stuff".

Within a few years, Nancy Evans and a few colleagues were able to start a small project with funding from NASA. They managed to find four rare Ampex FR-900 tape drives – highly specialized drives that had only been used by government agencies such as the FAA, USAF, and NASA. (The FR-900's transport was adapted from the two-inch Quadruplex videotape format, only in the FR-900's case, the drive was designed to record a wideband analog signal of any type for instrumentation or other purposes, rather than specifically a video signal as in the two-inch Quad's case.) Over time, Evans' team also collected documentation and spare parts for the tape drives from various government surplus sources.

The project was successful at getting the raw analog data from the tapes, but in order to generate the images, they discovered that they needed the specialized demodulation hardware that had been used by the Lunar Orbiter program but no longer existed. The members of the team attempted to get funding from NASA and private sources to build the hardware, but they were unsuccessful. Eventually, both Nancy Evans and Mark Nelson went on to other projects while the tape drives sat in Evans's garage.

In 2004, Philip Horzempa was doing research on the Lunar Orbiter program at the NASA History Office in Washington, D.C. In its archives, he happened to come across a memo from 1996 containing a proposal by Mark Nelson to digitize the Lunar Orbiter images, as described above. After about a year of searching, Horzempa made contact with Mark Nelson. The two of them decided to find funding and to restart the Lunar Orbiter tape recovery effort. They made contact with Jen Heldmann of the NASA Ames Research Center.

In early 2007, Horzempa commented on the Lunar Orbiter tape recovery effort on a Web forum, NASASpaceflight.com. As a result, Dennis Wingo contacted Philip Horzempa through that forum. Horzempa put Wingo in contact with Nelson and Evans, and they invited Wingo to join the team. In addition to the tape drives mentioned above, Nelson had been able to obtain several tape heads. The tape drives were absolutely essential to any effort to read the original Lunar Orbiter data tapes.

Dennis Wingo is president of the aerospace engineering company SkyCorp and a long-time worker in space and computing technologies. He knew he could muster the technical skills to tackle the management of renovating the tape drives, he could find contacts at NASA, and most importantly, he knew that the Moon was becoming a hot property again. Wingo said, "I knew the value of the tape drives and the tapes". Another group thought the same, writing, "future missions to the Moon have re-energized the lunar community and renewed interest in the Lunar Orbiter data".

A newer spacecraft, the Lunar Reconnaissance Orbiter (LRO), entered orbit around the Moon on June 23, 2009, and, after testing, it began its photographic mission that September. One of LRO's primary goals is to determine the risk to people working on the surface of the Moon. The LRO can create images of the surface that are comparable to the highest resolution images taken of the Moon from orbit during the Apollo era. The original Lunar Orbiter images were the highest resolution images ever taken of the Moon from orbit prior to the LRO's photography. Digitized Lunar Orbiter images would be invaluable to scientists studying changes in the Moon's surface.

== Expertise and facilities ==
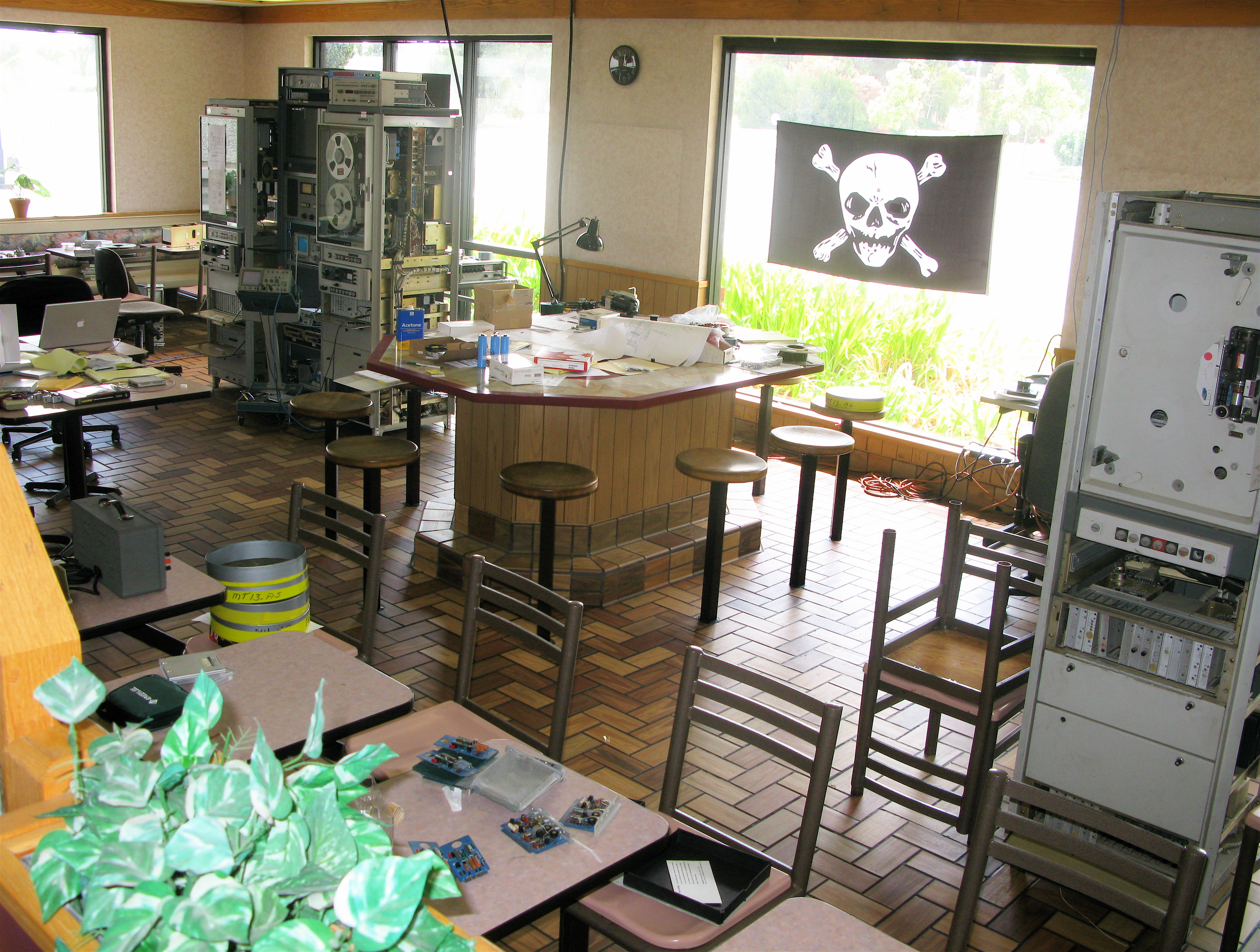
Front half of LOIRP's facilities

In February 2007, Wingo visited the four Ampex FR-900 tape drives for the first time in Evans's garage. Each drive was about 1.8 metres (6 ft) tall, 0.9 metres (3 ft) wide, as deep as a refrigerator, and weighed about 270 kilograms (600 lb). These were all coated with thick layers of dust and cobwebs. They were stored with a pallet of manuals and schematics for the tape drives, along with hard copies of data related to the lunar images. Meanwhile, the tapes were stored safely in a climate-controlled warehouse. There were about 1,500 tapes, all packed into boxes, stacked four deep on pallets, and shrink-wrapped.

Wingo and Keith Cowing, a former NASA employee and president of SpaceRef Interactive, respectively, now served as co-leaders of the Lunar Orbiter Image Recovery Project (LOIRP). Both Cowing and Wingo provided the funds required to get the project started. They spent about a year looking for more funding, facilities, documentation, and expertise. Pete Worden, director of NASA's Ames Research Center, agreed to store the tape drives and tapes in unused warehouse space until funding and facilities could be found to begin the restoration project.

In April 2007, the Jet Propulsion Laboratory released the tapes to the custody of Ames Research Center. Evans also transferred the ownership of the FR-900 drives to Wingo and Cowing. Wingo and Cowing rented two transfer trucks, loaded up the tape drives and documentation into one truck, and loaded the pallets of analog data tapes into the other truck. Cowing and Wingo then drove the trucks up to Mountain View, California, from Burbank. The drives and tapes then sat in storage for about the next year as funding for the project was sought.

Since the team required a facility with proper heating and cooling, and a sink, available vacant buildings outside the gate of Ames Research Center were whittled down to two: a barber shop, and a McDonald's restaurant that had closed weeks before. The barber shop was relatively small, so working there would have required that the tapes be stored at a separate warehouse. On the other hand, the former McDonald's was much larger, had good lighting, adequate power, air conditioning, and parking. The building turned out to need some improvements in the electrical wiring. By July 2008, the team had moved into the former McDonald's (Building 596), now dubbed "McMoon's".

Wingo and Cowing quickly found more expertise in Ken Zin, a U.S. Army veteran who had long experience in working with analog tape machines, including the FR-900 series. By coincidence, Zin's brother worked at NASA Ames Research Center and it is via this coincidence that Wingo and Cowing initially got in touch with Zin. With the assistance of Ken Davidian at NASA Headquarters, funding was found in 2008 for a pilot project to show that the drives could be repaired, and that images could be recovered from the original tapes. The first task was to methodically disassemble and clean the tape drives. Meanwhile, Zin began testing the systems of the tape drives and making lists of devices to replace and refurbish. Parts for the drives were bought on eBay, online electronic parts stores, and other places.

== Management and recruiting allies ==
Wingo and Cowing plunged into the management of the project: ordering parts, managing funds, searching surplus yards for equipment, researching refurbishing companies, and recruiting allies to the project. He began sending out an email newsletter, one that was later converted to a blog, MoonViews.com, and posting photos to the project's Facebook page. Student interns from the nearby San Jose State University were recruited, and the team requested help from retired and current employees of Ampex and from blog writers with audiences that might be able to help. Every day there seemed to be a new visitor to McMoon's, such as Dr. Lisa Gaddis from the USGS project to digitize the Lunar Orbiter films, and Charlie Byrne, who wrote the memo recommending that the Lunar Orbiter data be stored on magnetic tape. The project was reported in the Los Angeles Times, Computerworld, National Geographic, the Associated Press, American Libraries, the local news, and numerous blogs. The project was funded by NASA, SkyCorp, SpaceRef Interactive, and private individuals.

Included in every news story was the message that the images are a vital piece of history, but more than this, that they contain scientific data of a time, place, and quality that has not been repeated. These are images that can assist in the current research about the Moon and the climate of the Earth. There may even be other lost data from the same era recorded using the same tape drives that could benefit from the efforts of the LOIRP team.

== Media and metadata ==
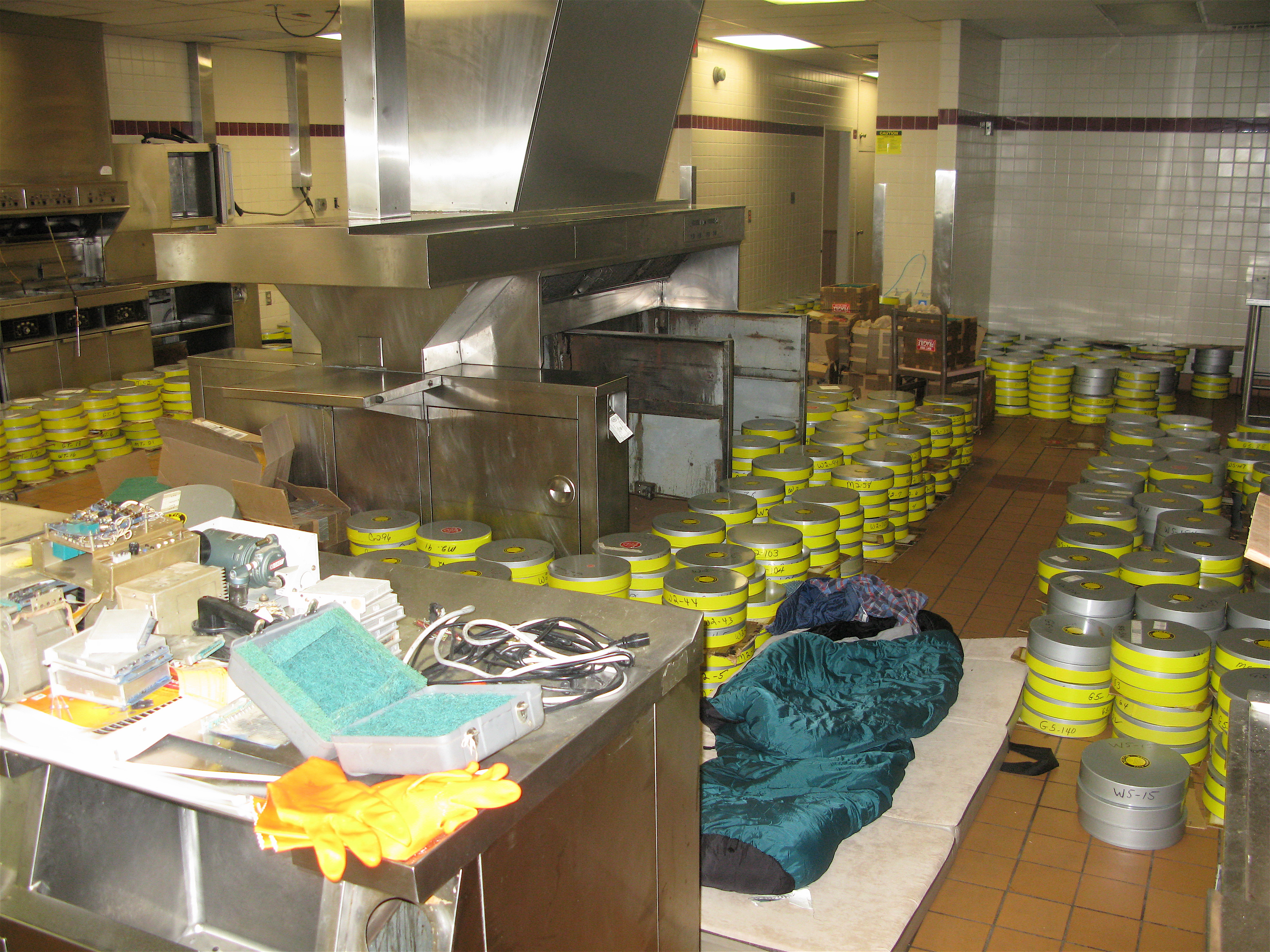
Stacks of 2-inch tape reels inside McMoon's

Shortly after moving into McMoon's, a group of students from the NASA Astrobiology Academy was recruited to remove all the tapes from the boxes, and put the tapes in order. Each tape takes about an hour to run on the tape drive, and holds one high-resolution image and one medium-resolution image. When archived in the early 1970s, each reel of tape was labeled, wrapped in a clear plastic bag, and enclosed in a mu-metal tin, and sealed with yellow plastic tape. Additional labels have been placed on the outside of the tape container. Each tape is labeled with a code that usually consists of two letters and two numbers, for example: MT_19, WT_45, and GT_46. One of the Astrobiology Academy students realized that the first letter indicated which ground station recorded the data on the tape in that container: "M" indicates that the tape was recorded in Madrid, Spain; "W" indicates that the tape was recorded in Woomera, Australia; and "G" indicates that the tape was recorded in Goldstone, California. This guess was confirmed when the team listened to the audio track at the beginning of a few of the tapes, wherein the operator of the ground station recites information about the tape and the recording. On tapes marked with an "M", the operator has a distinctly Spanish accent. On tapes marked with a "W", the operator has a distinctly Australian accent. On tapes marked with a "G" the operator speaks with an American accent. Sometimes audio track captures an operator at one tracking station talking to an operator at another tracking station. Each tape's opening audio includes the date that the tape was recorded in both local and Universal Time.

== Hardware and funding ==
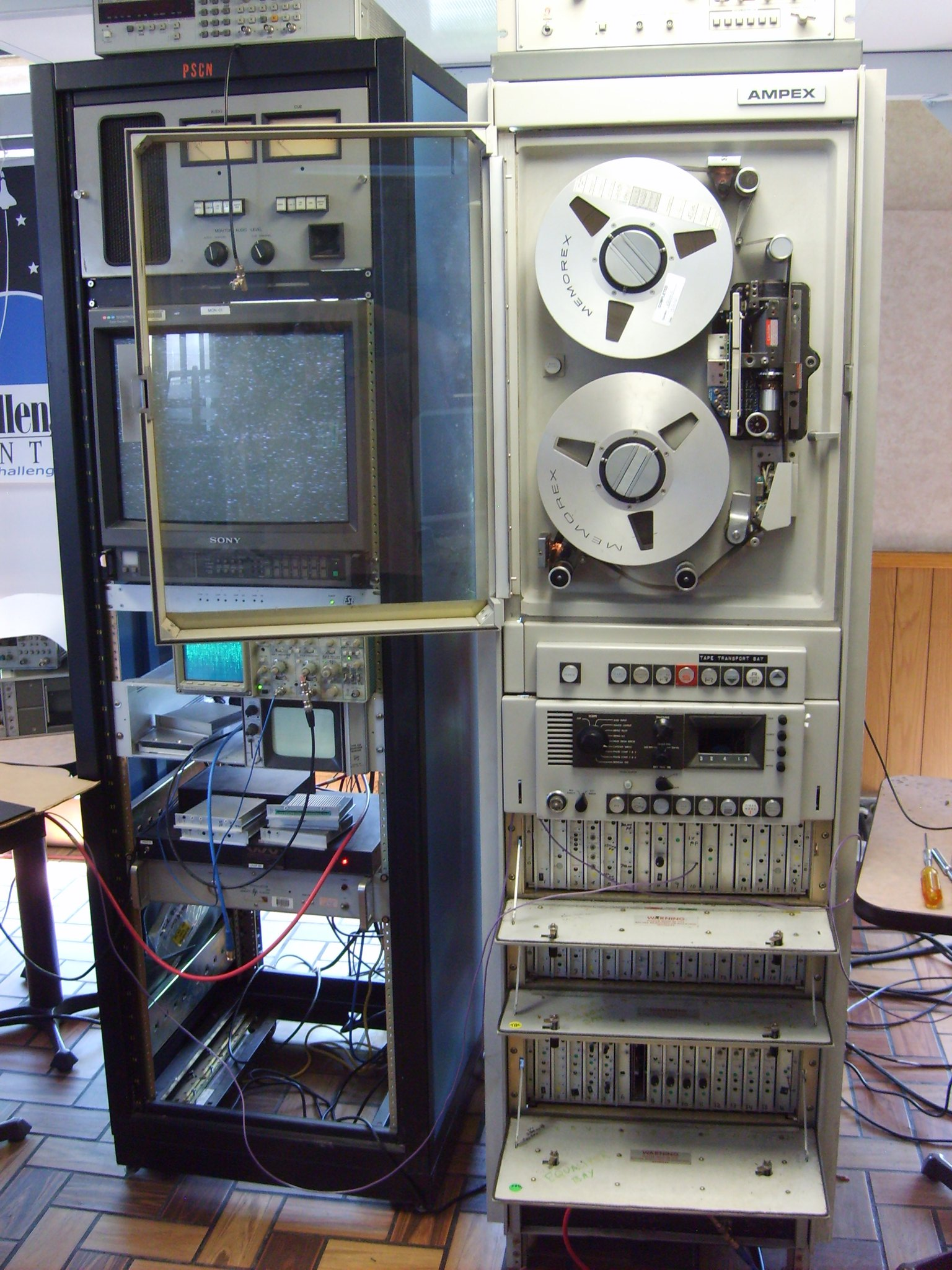
One of the FR-900 tape drives

In a completed and working magnetic tape drive system, the tape-drive heads apply a very specific magnetic field to the tape; the tape then induces a change in electric current, which is captured. The data from the Lunar Orbiter tapes is then run through a demodulator, and through an analog-to-digital converter so that it can be fed into a computer for digital processing. Each image is divided up into strips on the tape, so the computer is used to bring the strips together to create a whole image.

Once the project started in earnest in July 2008, results came quickly. In only a couple of weeks, the first tape drive had been powered up, although it was clear that many parts still needed to be replaced. Another week of cleaning and testing revealed that among the four drives and batches of spare parts there were enough good power supplies to run one of the tape drives, and there was at least one working head for the drive. The head is the mechanism that touches the tape and reads and writes data, so it is absolutely critical; in the case of the Ampex FR-900 tape drives, the heads were not manufactured after 1974, cannot be replaced, and can only be refurbished at great expense by a single small company.

After another month of repairing and replacing parts, testing and tuning mechanisms, the project got the first solid result that the tapes were good. Each tape starts with a short standard-format audio clip of the operator, and the tape drives were able to read the audio signal. (Hear a sample of the audio.) This does not use the video heads that are needed to read the Lunar Orbiter data off the tape, but this demonstrated that the tapes had not deteriorated and that many of the sub-systems of the tape drive were in good working order.

The documentation for the tape drives was substantially incomplete, which kept the team from understanding the right way to repair, maintain, and use the tape drives. The search for documentation has been extensive and usually disappointing, as it often turns out that retired or elderly engineers have just recently cleaned out their garages. Posting to a blog, Dennis Wingo said, "I cannot tell you how many times we have heard similar stories of recently tossed manuals over the last six months". At just the right moment the team heard from a friend of a friend that a mother lode of maintenance documentation stored on aperture cards (microfilm embedded in computer punch cards) had been saved by the retired head of Ampex field engineering. This documentation would make it possible for the team to understand the correct procedures for repairing the tape drives and aligning the mechanics.

At this point in the restoration, the demodulation of the tapes had become the biggest issue. The team was not sure if the demodulation board that came with the system was the correct one, if they needed a different one, or if they needed this one and another one. At the same time, they discovered a tape, which, from the audio clip at the start, sounded as if it contained a demodulated recording of one of the images. This was a lucky break, as it meant that a demodulator would not be needed to generate images from this tape. If the team could rescue this image, the project would prove "that the drive can be refurbished to the point of reliably playing a tape back". Work continued, and the team coined the term "technoarchaeology" to describe the process of researching which tape contained what image.

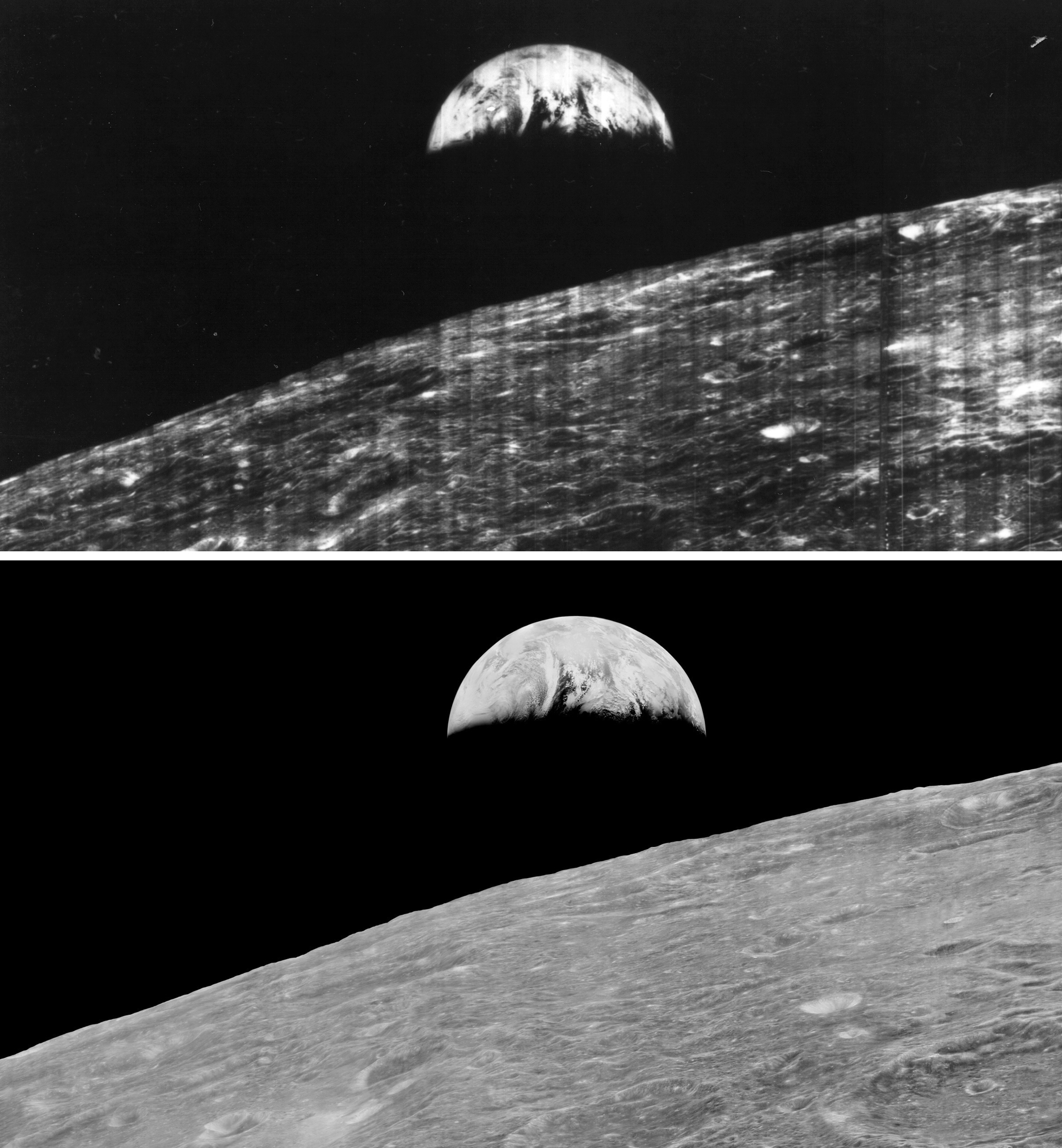
Direct comparison of the original photo to the restored version

On November 13, 2008, NASA held a press conference and announced that they were releasing the first image that had been restored: a striking image, taken on August 23, 1966, of the Earth as viewed, for the very first time, from the Moon. This was a major milestone that showed that the tapes and the tape drives were both good. Preliminary analysis showed that the image had "four times the dynamic range of the ... [original] film image and up to twice the ultimate resolution". The NASA Exploration Systems Mission Directorate (ESMD) had sponsored the team so far with a small grant of $100,000. With these results, more funds were released—another $150,000 to complete a major restoration of the drives and to create the demodulation hardware needed for the other tapes. Gregory Schmidt, deputy director of the NASA Lunar Science Institute at Ames said, "Now that we've demonstrated the capability to retrieve images, our goal is to complete the tape drives' restoration and move toward retrieving all of the images on the remaining tapes".

Within a month, the next round of funding came through and restoration began in earnest. The heads, capstan and rotor motors were being restored by two different companies. New documentation about the demodulation was discovered, and the team began building a board by hand. Custom belts were being manufactured to replace the old ones. Software was being written to process the digital images. The biggest expense was the heads, which cost around $8,000 each to be refurbished.

On March 21, 2009, the team announced that they had rescued an un-demodulated image from one of the tapes, using the newly perfected demodulation system. The image, of the crater Copernicus, is from the Lunar Orbiter 2 spacecraft taken on November 24, 1966. NASA Scientist Martin Swetnick was quoted in a Time magazine article from 1966, calling this image "one of the great pictures of the century".

By April, the team had digitized 30 images. A couple of months later an article in Computerworld revealed that the project had a new grant of $600,000, and had hopes to completely digitize all the images by February 2010. Most of the new funding came from NASA, but about 10% came from other donors. This new funding allowed the team to restore a second tape drive to full operation by November 2009, which made the process of restoring the images that much faster.

The Ampex FR-900 heads were refurbished by Videomagnetics of Colorado Springs, Colorado, the only company in the world that still refurbished Ampex and RCA Quadruplex video heads.

== Future preservation ==
By April 2017, all images had been delivered to the NASA Planetary Data System (PDS), a digital repository for NASA mission and ground support data. Peer review of the LOIRP PDS submission began in May 2017. The LOIRP Online Data Volumes were published for public access by NASA at the PDS Cartography and Imaging Sciences Node on January 31, 2018.

== See also ==
- Apollo 11 missing tapes
- International Cometary Explorer, a spacecraft in solar orbit recontacted in 2014 by many of the members of Lunar Orbiter tape recovery effort
