= Lunar Orbiter 4 =

United States lunar probe

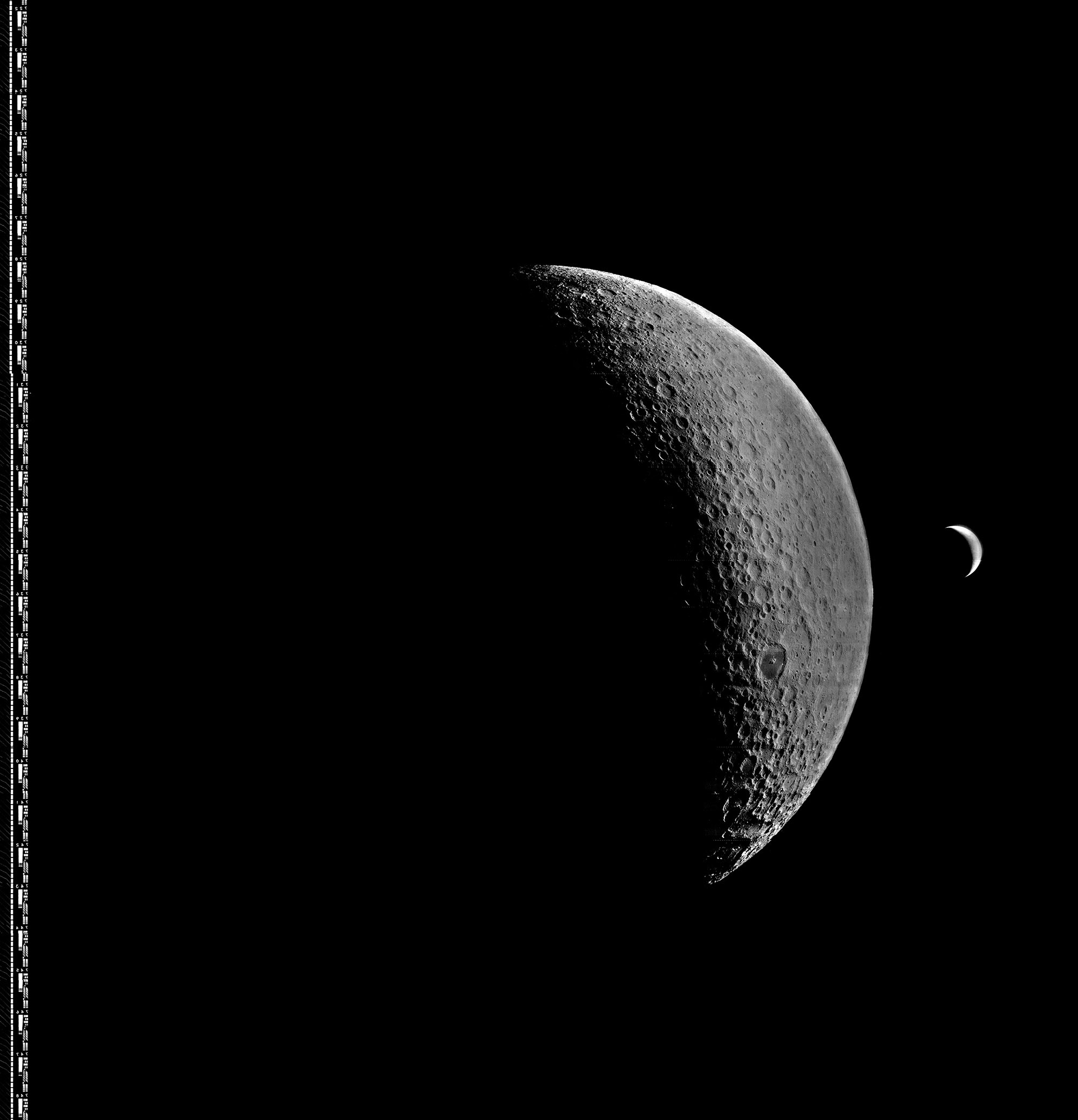
- Image taken by Lunar Orbiter 4, showing the Moon with a crescent Earth in the background. Enhanced by LOIRP.
- Mission type: Lunar orbiter
- Operator: NASA
- COSPAR ID: 1967-041A
- SATCAT no.: 2772
- Mission duration: 180 days

Spacecraft properties
- Manufacturer: Langley Research Center
- Launch mass: 385.6 kilograms (850 lb)

Start of mission
- Launch date: May 4, 1967, 22:25:00 UTC
- Rocket: Atlas SLV-3 Agena-D
- Launch site: Cape Canaveral LC-13

End of mission
- Last contact: July 17, 1967
- Decay date: October 6, 1967

Orbital parameters
- Reference system: Selenocentric
- Semi-major axis: 6,152.5 kilometers (3,823.0 mi)
- Eccentricity: 0.28
- Periselene altitude: 4,449 kilometers (2,764 mi)
- Aposelene altitude: 7,856 kilometers (4,881 mi)
- Inclination: 85.5 degrees
- Period: 721 minutes
- Epoch: March 7, 1967, 20:00:00 UTC

Lunar orbiter
- Orbital insertion: May 8, 1967, 21:54 UTC
- Orbits: 360

Lunar Orbiter 4 was a robotic U.S. spacecraft, part of the Lunar Orbiter Program, designed to orbit the Moon, after the three previous orbiters had completed the required needs for Apollo mapping and site selection. It was given a more general objective, to "perform a broad systematic photographic survey of lunar surface features in order to increase the scientific knowledge of their nature, origin, and processes, and to serve as a basis for selecting sites for more detailed scientific study by subsequent orbital and landing missions". It was also equipped to collect selenodetic, radiation intensity, and micrometeoroid impact data.

== Mission summary ==
The spacecraft was placed in a cislunar trajectory and injected into an elliptical near polar high lunar orbit for data acquisition. The orbit was 2,706 by 6,111 kilometres (1,681 mi × 3,797 mi) with an inclination of 85.5 degrees and a period of 12 hours.

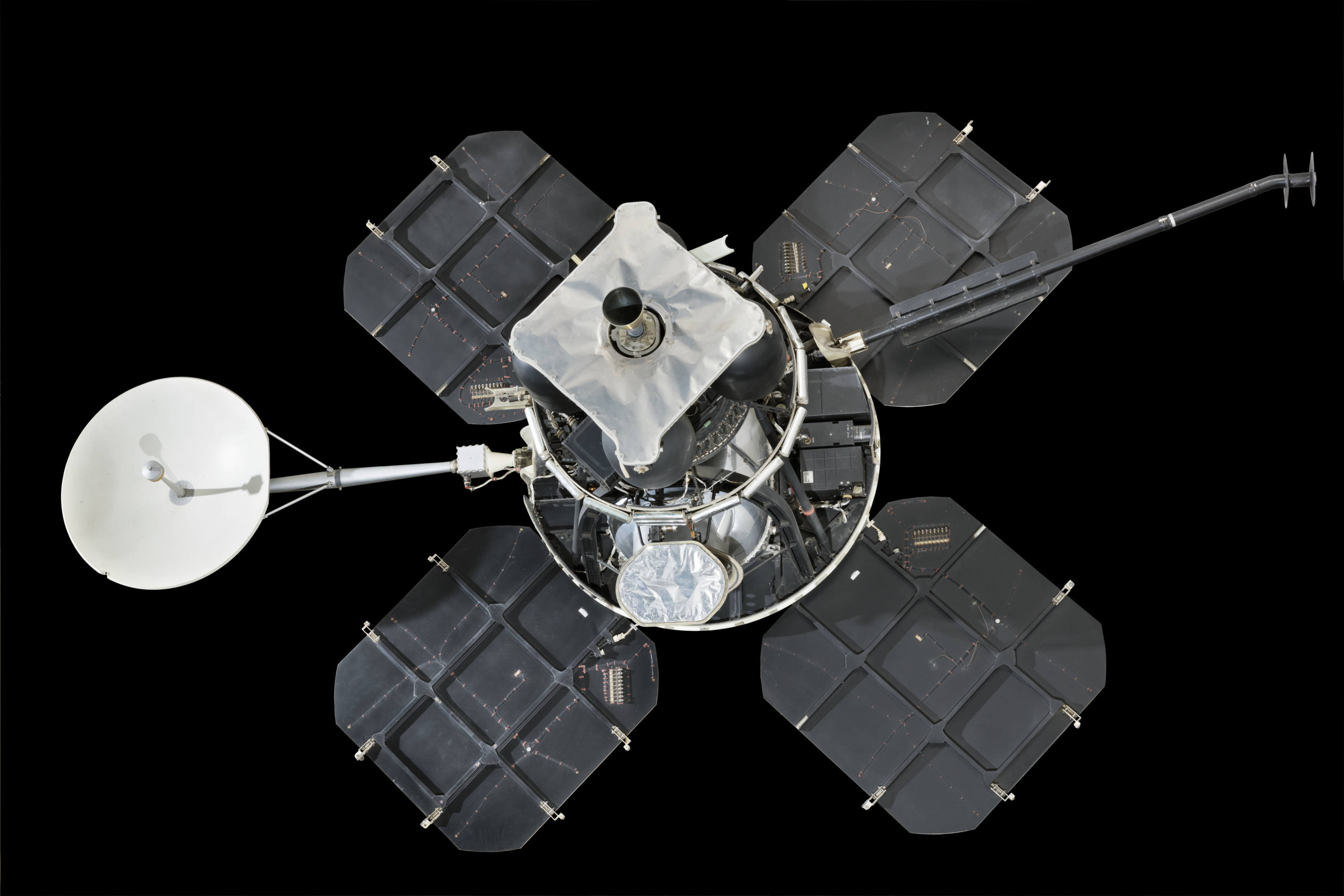
Replica of a Lunar Orbiter spacecraft

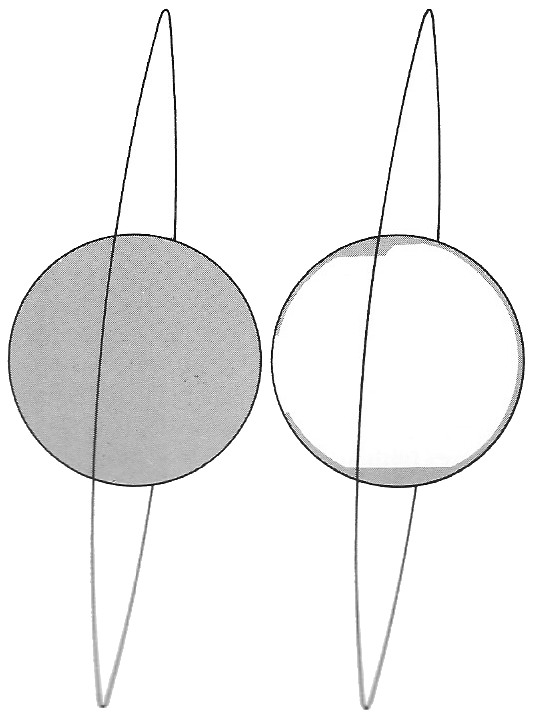
Spacecraft orbit and photographic coverage on the near side (left) and far side (right)

After initial photography on May 11, 1967 problems started occurring with the camera's thermal door, which was not responding well to commands to open and close. Fear that the door could become stuck in the closed position covering the camera lenses led to a decision to leave the door open. This required extra attitude control maneuvers on each orbit to prevent light leakage into the camera which would ruin the film. On May 13 it was discovered that light leakage was damaging some of the film, and the door was tested and partially closed. Some fogging of the lens was then suspected due to condensation resulting from the lower temperatures. Changes in the attitude raised the temperature of the camera and generally eliminated the fogging. Continuing problems with the readout drive mechanism starting and stopping beginning on May 20 resulted in a decision to terminate the photographic portion of the mission on May 26. Despite problems with the readout drive the entire film was read and transmitted. The spacecraft acquired photographic data from May 11 to 26, 1967, and readout occurred through June 1, 1967. The orbit was then lowered to gather orbital data for the upcoming Lunar Orbiter 5 mission.

A total of 419 high-resolution and 127 medium-resolution frames were acquired, which covered 99% of the Moon's near side at resolutions from 58 to 134 metres (190 to 440 ft). Accurate data was acquired from all other experiments throughout the mission. Radiation data showed increased dosages due to solar particle events producing low energy protons. The spacecraft was used for tracking until it struck the lunar surface due to the natural decay of the orbit no later than October 31, 1967, between 22 and 30 degrees W longitude.

Instruments
Lunar Photographic Studies:	Evaluation of Apollo and Surveyor landing sites
Meteoroid; Detectors:	Detection of micrometeoroids in the lunar environment
Caesium Iodide Dosimeters:	Radiation environment en route to and near the Moon
Selenodesy:	Gravitational field and physical properties of the Moon

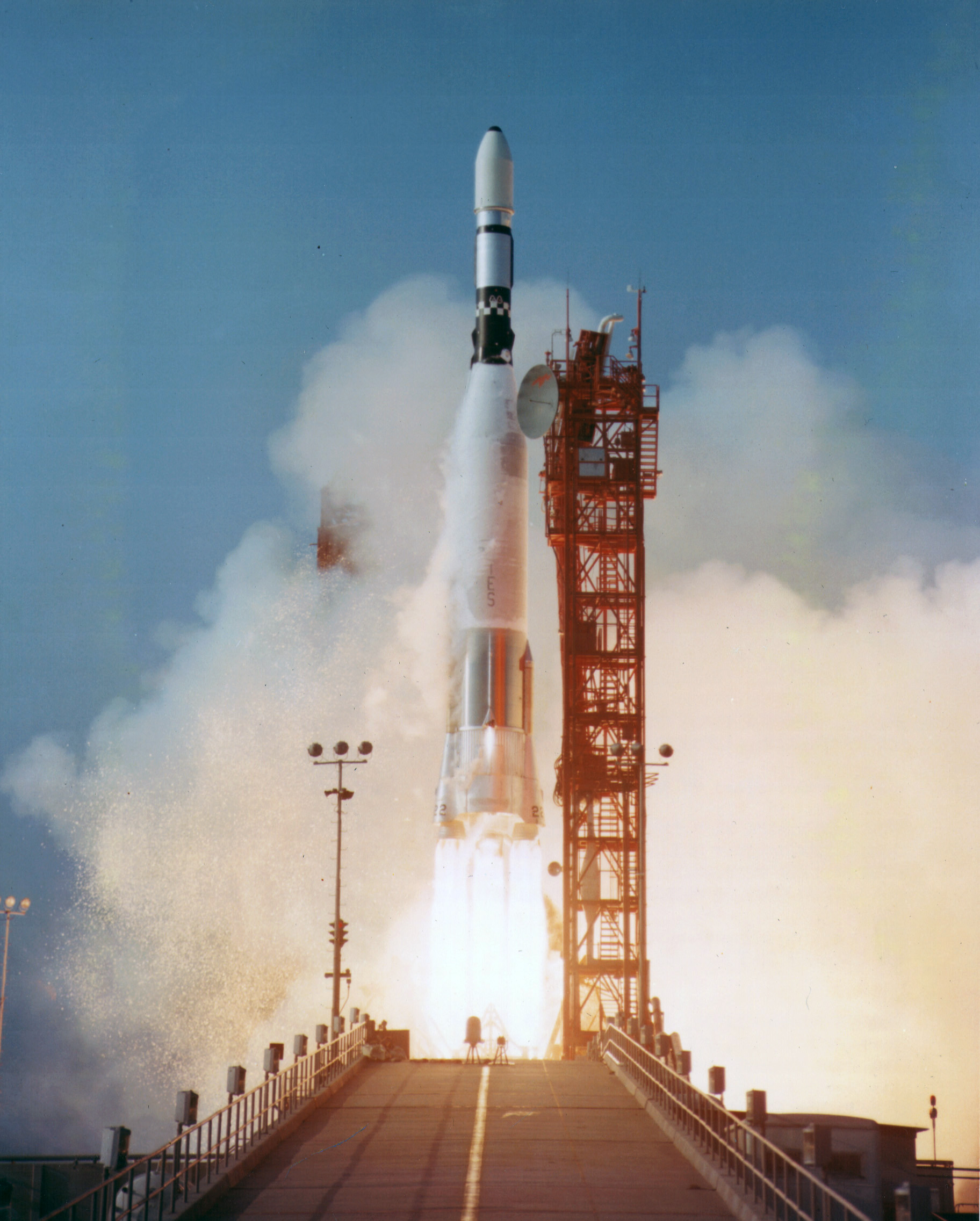
Launch of Lunar Orbiter 4 from an Atlas-Agena rocket on May 4, 1967

Keldysh on May 16, 1967 (42.79°N 34.33°E)

Timocharis crater on May 19, 1967 (42.76°N 12.27°W)

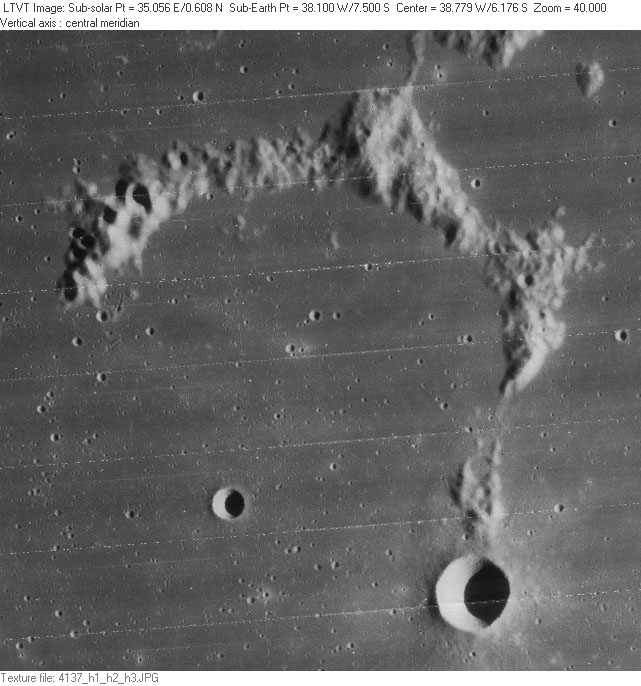
Wichmann crater (lower right) and Wichman R (arc of ridges) on May 21, 1967

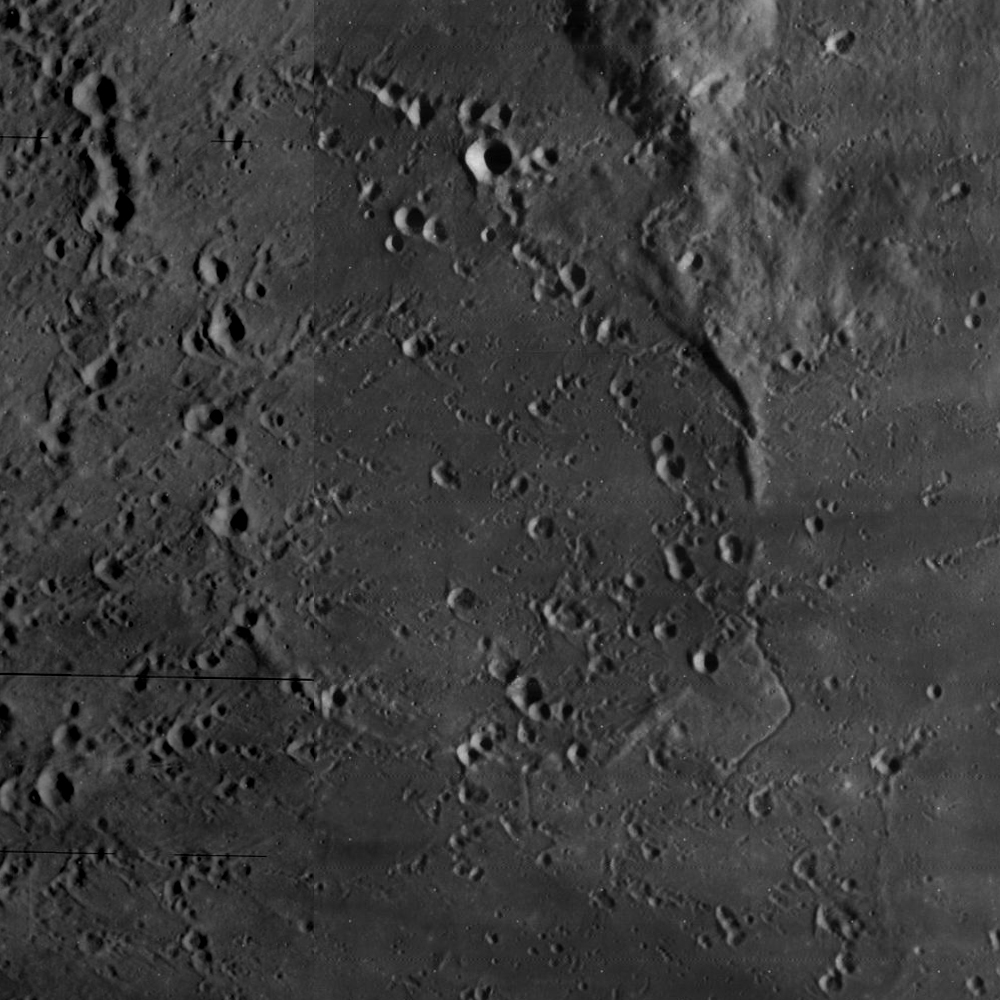
Image of Stadius crater

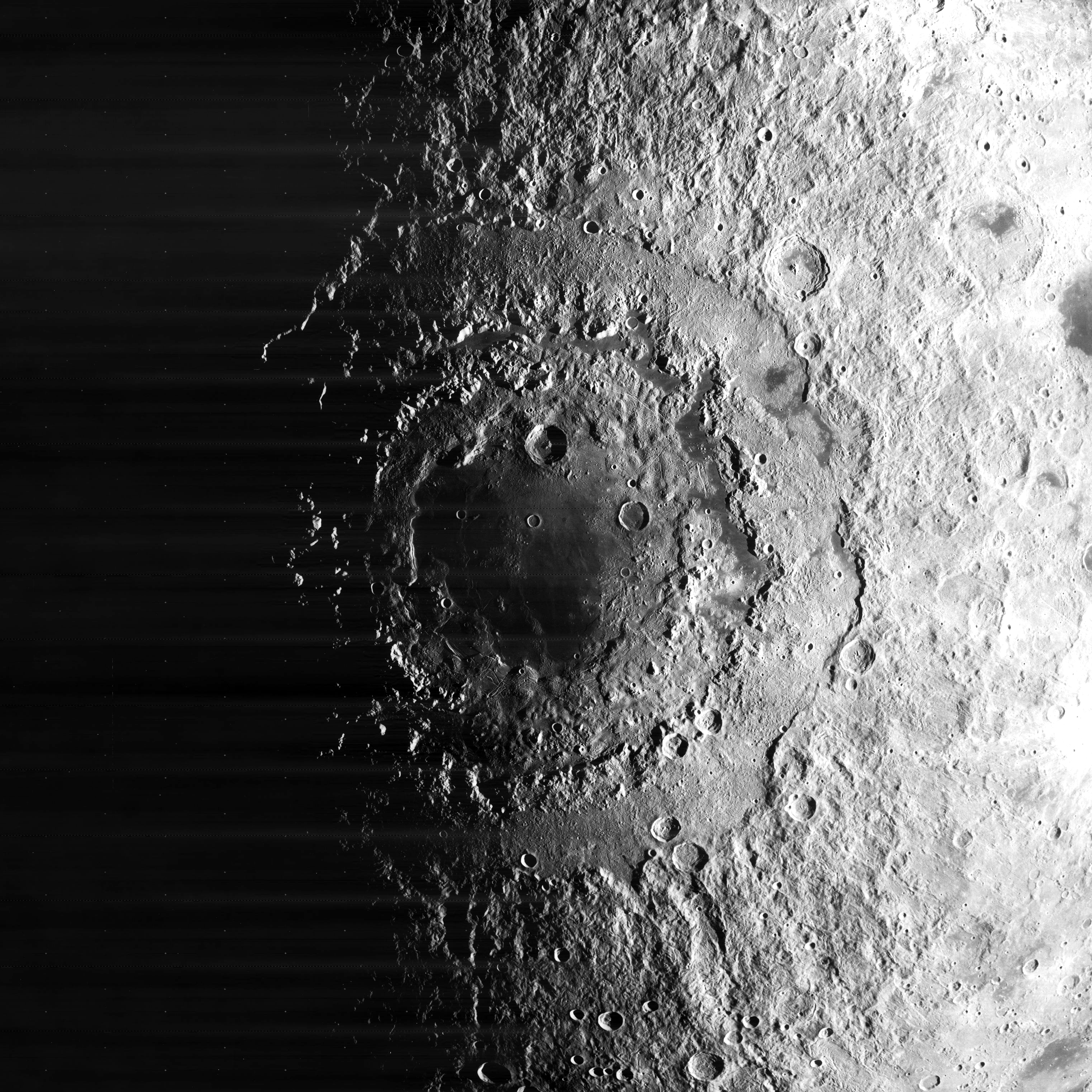
Mare Orientale on the far side of the Moon, May 1967

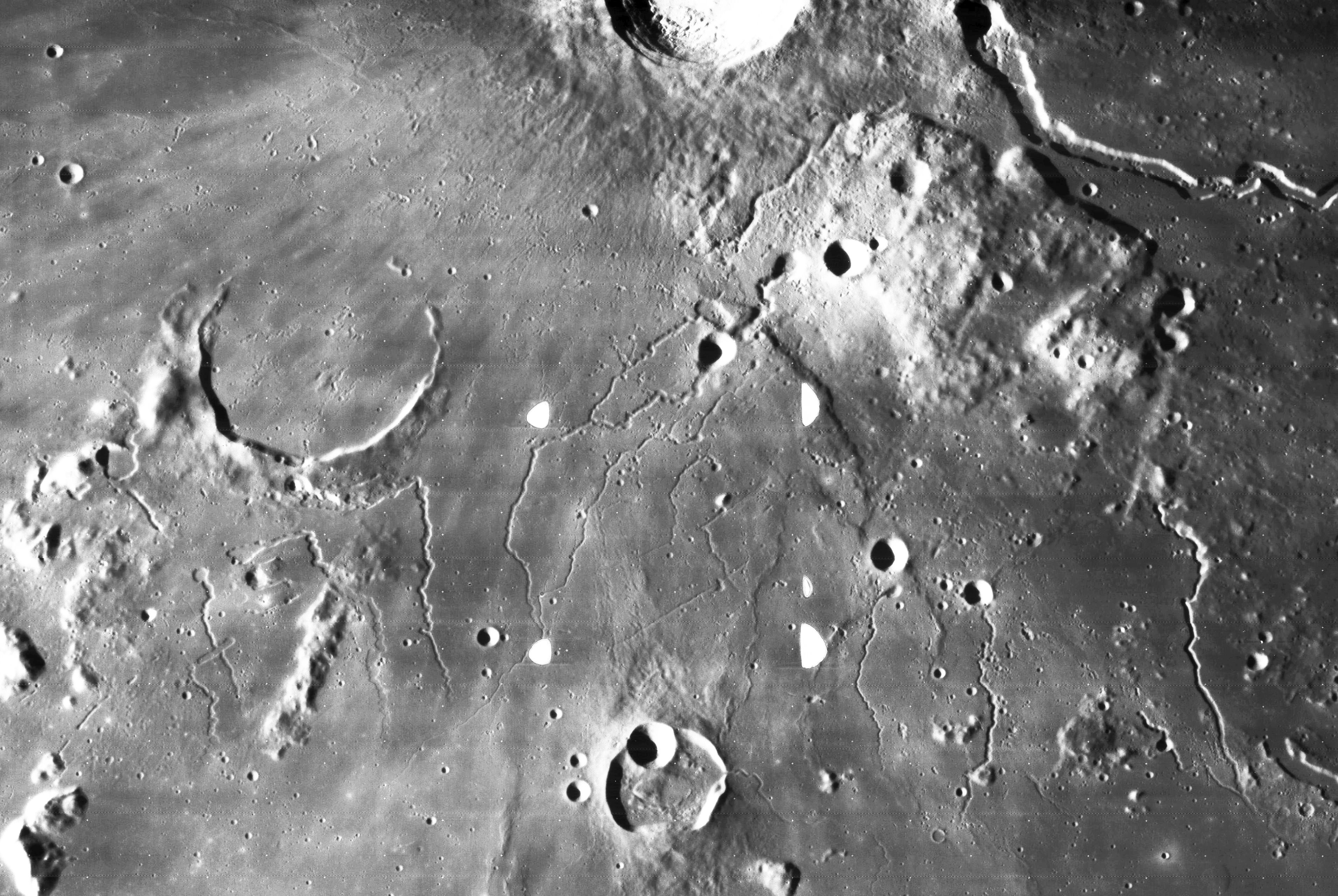
Lunar Orbiter 4 image of Aristarchus crater (top) and Vallis Schröteri, May 1967

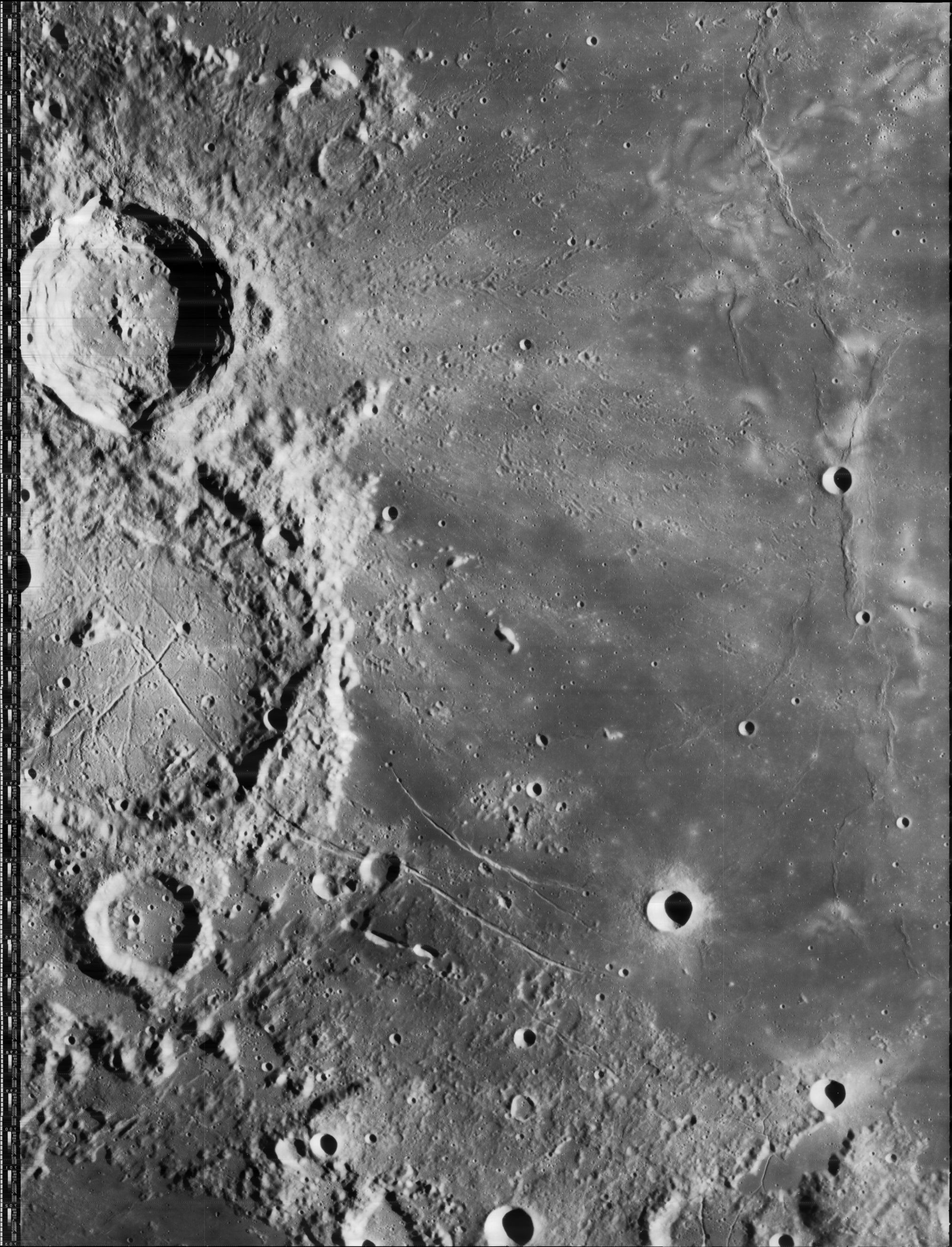
Planitia Descensus, the landing site of Luna 9

== See also ==
- Lunar Orbiter Image Recovery Project
- Exploration of the Moon
- List of artificial objects on the Moon
- List of missions to the Moon
  - Lunar Orbiter 1
  - Lunar Orbiter 2
  - Lunar Orbiter 3
  - Lunar Orbiter 5
