= Wachsman =

Wachsman is a surname. Notable people with the surname include:

- Alois Wachsman (1898–1942), Czech painter, stage designer and architect
- Gillian Wachsman (born 1966), American pair skater
- Klaus Wachsman or Klaus Wachsmann (1907–1984), British ethnomusicologist of German birth
- Nachshon Wachsman, Israeli soldier captured by Hamas and killed during a rescue attempt

== See also ==
- Wachmann
- Wachsmann
- Wachuma
- Waksman
- Wassan
- Waxman
- Wichmann (disambiguation)
