= Wichmann =

Wichmann or Wichman may refer to:

- Wichmann (crater), a lunar impact crater
- Wichmann the Elder (d. 944), medieval German nobleman
- Wichmann the Younger (d. 967), son of the Elder, medieval German nobleman
- Wichmann von Seeburg (1115–1192), Archbishop of Magdeburg, in modern Germany
- Wichmann Diesel (1903–1986) Norwegian marine engine manufacturer (now part of Wärtsilä)
- Wichmann (surname)
