= Wichmann (surname) =

Wichmann is a German surname.

== Geographical distribution ==
As of 2014, 78.7% of all known bearers of the surname Wichmann were residents of Germany (frequency 1:3,983), 8.0% of the United States (1:177,345), 3.6% of Denmark (1:6,135), 3.5% of South Africa (1:59,575) and 1.3% of Brazil (1:631,210).

In Germany, the frequency of the surname was higher than national average (1:3,983) in the following states:

1. Bremen (1:1,107)
2. Lower Saxony (1:1,538)
3. Schleswig-Holstein (1:1,639)
4. Mecklenburg-Vorpommern (1:1,839)
5. Hamburg (1:1,846)
6. Brandenburg (1:2,088)
7. Saxony-Anhalt (1:2,251)

In Denmark, the frequency of the surname was higher than national average (1:6,135) in the following regions:

1. Capital Region of Denmark (1:4,202)
2. Region Zealand (1:4,575)
3. Region of Southern Denmark (1:5,388)

== People ==
=== Wichmann ===
- Achim Krause-Wichmann (1930–2000), German rower
- Amalie Wichmann (born 1995), Danish handball player
- C. E. A. Wichmann (1851–1927), German geologist and mineralogist
- Clara Wichmann (1885–1922), German–Dutch lawyer, writer, anarcho-syndicalist, feminist and atheist
- Cody Wichmann (born 1992), American football player
- Erich Wichmann-Harbeck (1900–1976), Chilean sailor
- Eyvind Wichmann (1928–2019), US-American physicist
- Friedrich-Wilhelm Wichmann (1901–1974), German sprinter
- Hans Wichmann (1905–1981), German middle-distance runner
- Joanna Wichmann (1905–1985), German-born textile artist
- Kanchi Wichmann (born 1974), British filmmaker
- Kristoffer Wichmann (born 1981), Danish association football manager and player
- Kurt-Werner Wichmann (1949–1993), German serial killer responsible for the Göhrde Murders
- Ludwig Wilhelm Wichmann (1788–1859), German sculptor
- Mathias Wichmann (born 1991), Danish footballer
- Moritz Ludwig George Wichmann (1821–1859), German astronomer
- Siegfried Wichmann (1921–2015), German art historian
- Søren Wichmann (born 1964), Danish linguist
- Tamás Wichmann (1948–2020), Hungarian sprint canoer
- Valery Wichman, LGBT rights activist from the Cook Islands
- Yrjö Wichmann (1868–1932), Finnish linguist

=== Wichman ===
- Duane Wichman-Evans Jr. (born 2003), New Zealand actor
- Vaine Wichman, Cook Islands politician and development economist
