= Luna 8 =

Space probe

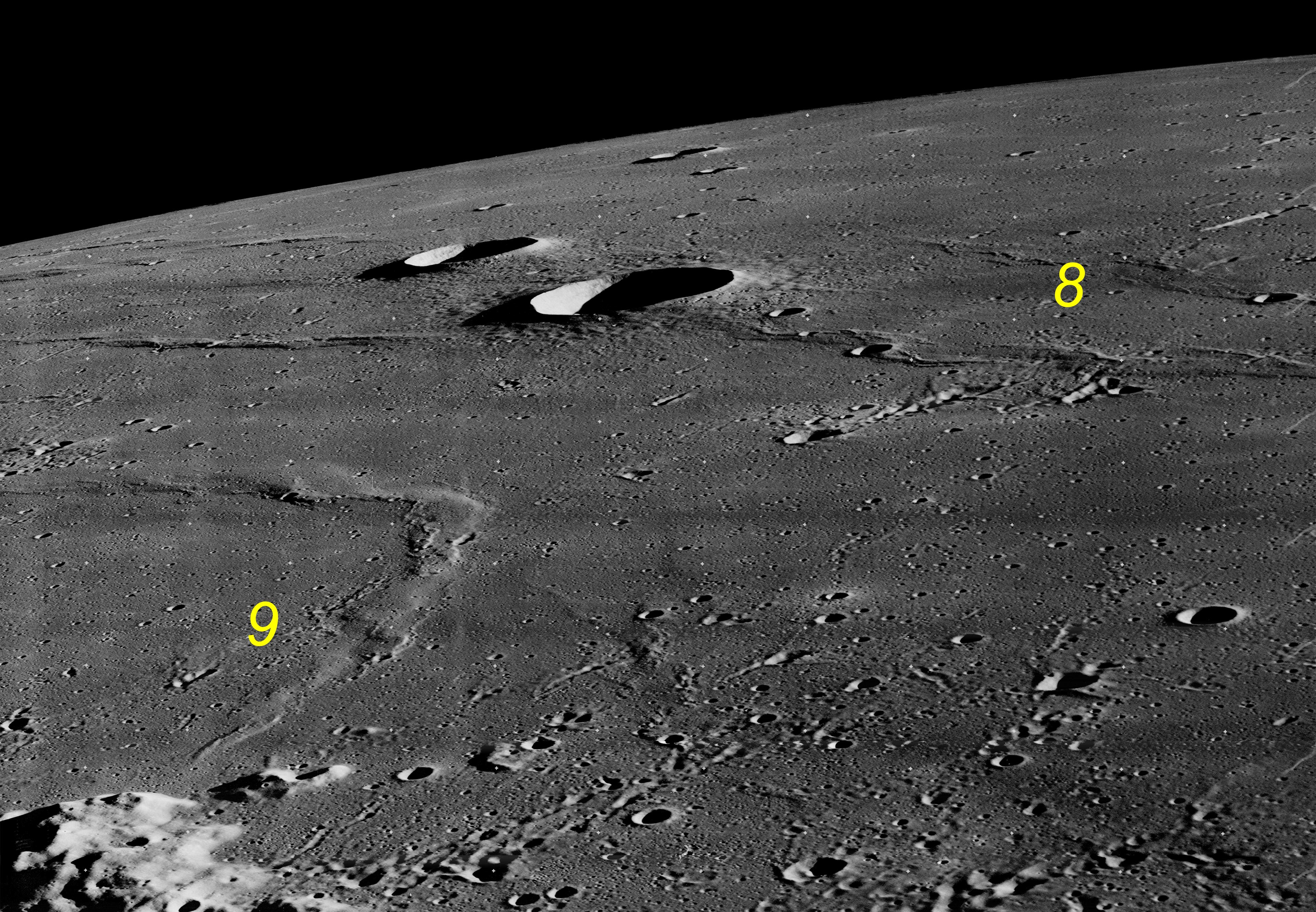
- Oblique view of Planitia Descensus showing crash site of Luna 8 and the landing point of Luna 9 (Lunar Orbiter 3 image)
- Mission type: Lunar lander
- Operator: Soviet space program
- COSPAR ID: 1965-099A
- SATCAT no.: 1810
- Mission duration: 3 days, 11 hours, 5 minutes

Spacecraft properties
- Spacecraft type: Ye-6
- Manufacturer: OKB-1
- Launch mass: 1,550 kg (3,420 lb)

Start of mission
- Launch date: 3 December 1965, 10:46:14 UTC
- Rocket: Molniya 8K78
- Launch site: Baikonur 31/6

Lunar impact (failed landing)
- Impact date: 6 December 1965, 21:51:30 UTC
- Impact site: 9.1°N 63.3°W

Luna 8 (E-6 or Ye-6 series), also known as Lunik 8, was a lunar space probe of the Luna program.

== Mission ==
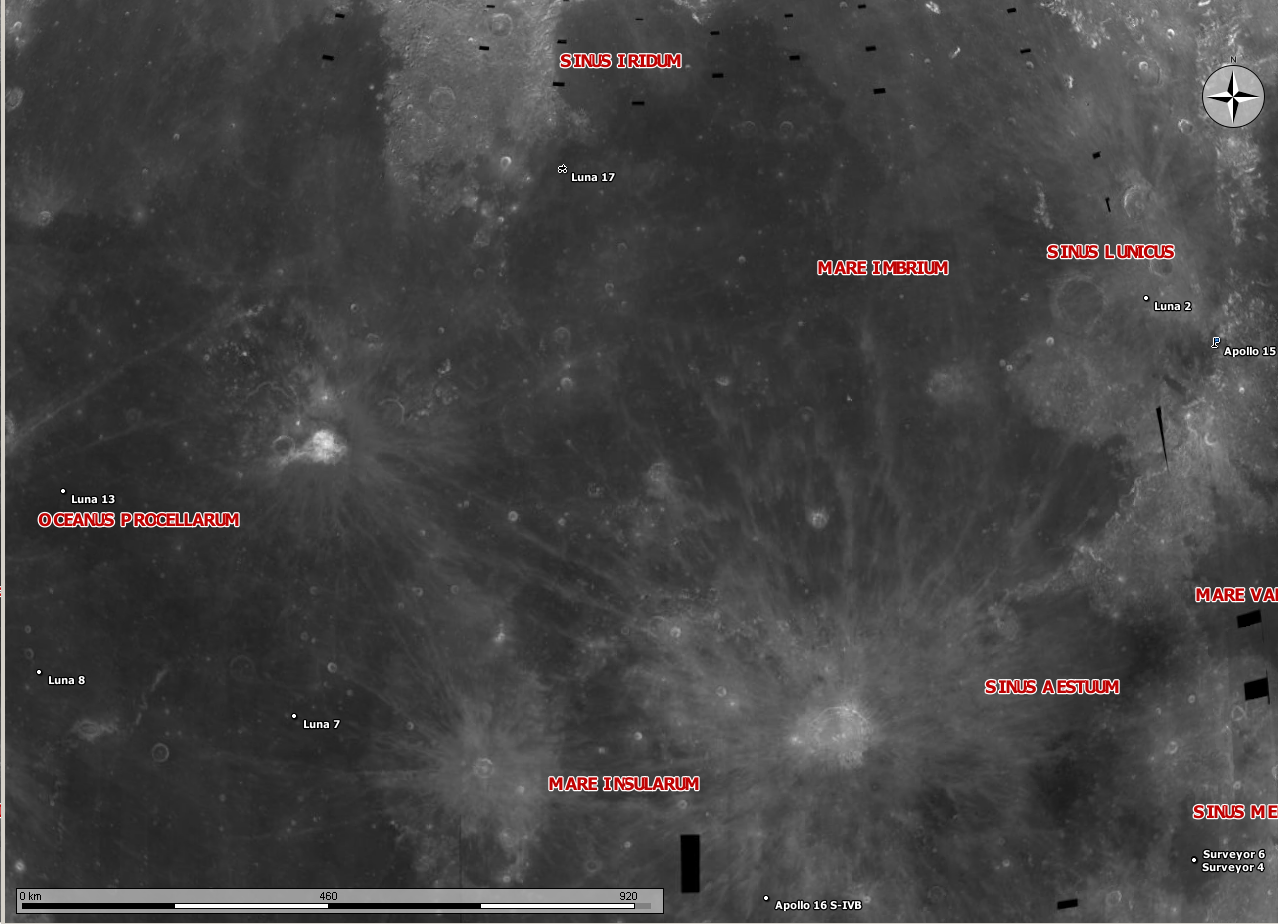
Map showing the location of Luna 8 near the lower left, in relation to other Moon missions.

It was launched in on 3 December 1965 with the objective of achieving a soft landing on the Moon; however, its retrorocket firing occurred too late, and suffered a hard impact on the lunar surface on the Oceanus Procellarum (Ocean of Storms). The mission did complete the experimental testing of its stellar-guidance system and the ground-control of its radio telemetry equipment, its flight trajectory, and its other instrumentation.

This, the eleventh Soviet attempt to achieve a lunar soft landing, nearly succeeded. After a successful midcourse correction on 4 December, this spacecraft headed toward the Moon without any apparent problems. Just before the scheduled firing of its retrorocket, a command was sent to inflate cushioning air bags around the landing probe. However, a plastic mounting bracket apparently pierced one of the two air bags. The resulting ejection of the air put the spacecraft into a spin of about 12 degrees per second. The spacecraft momentarily regained its proper attitude, long enough for a nine-second-long retrorocket firing, but Luna 8 became unstable again. Without a retrorocket burn long enough to reduce its velocity sufficiently for a survivable landing, Luna 8 plummeted to the lunar surface and crashed at 21:51:30 UT on 6 December in the west of Oceanus Procellarum. The coordinates of the crash site are 9.1°N 63.3°W.

== See also ==
- List of artificial objects on the Moon
- List of missions to the Moon
