= Waxman =

Waxman, or alternatively Wachsmann, is a surname. Notable people with the surname include:

- Al Waxman (1935–2001), Canadian actor
- Alois Wachsman (1898–1942), Czech painter and architect
- Bedřich Wachsmann (1820–1897), Czech painter and architect
- Chaim I. Waxman (born 1941), sociologist
- Daniel Wachsmann (born 1946), Israeli filmmaker, producer, and director
- David Waxman, American DJ, remixer and producer
- Esther Wachsmann (or Esther Hamerman; 1886–1977), Polish-born American painter
- Franz Waxman (1906–1967), composer
- Harry Waxman (1912–1984), English cinematographer
- Henry Waxman (born 1939), American politician
- Jiří Voskovec (Wachsmann) (1905–1981), Czech-American actor
- Jonathan Waxman (born 1950), American chef
- Keoni Waxman (born 1968), American film director
- Klaus Wachsmann (1907–1984), ethnomusicologist
- Konrad Wachsmann (1901–1980), architect
- Matthew Waxman (born c. 1972), American legal scholar and author
- Michael Waxman, American film and television director
- Meyer Waxman (1887–1969), rabbi and scholar
- Mordecai Waxman (1917–2002), Conservative rabbi
- Murray Waxman (1925–2022), Canadian basketball player
- Nachshon Wachsman (1975–1994), Israeli soldier
- Nikolaus Wachsmann (born 1971), German historian
- Seth P. Waxman (born 1951), U.S. Solicitor General
- Sharon Waxman (born c.1963), American journalist
- Sidney Waxman (1923–2005), American horticulturist and educator
- Stan Waxman (1922–2013), American basketball player
- Stephen Waxman (born 1945), American neurologist and neuroscientist
- Wayne Waxman, American philosopher

== See also ==
- Waxman Committee, named after Henry Waxman
- Waxman report, named after Henry A. Waxman
- Hatch-Waxman Act
- om Hatch Waxman Exemption
- Waxman-Markey (Bill)
- Waxman-Geschwind syndrome
- Waksman
- Wachsmann
