= Moritz Ludwig George Wichmann =

19th century German astronomer

Moritz Ludwig George Wichmann (1821–1859) was a German astronomer. He was an ardent observer of minor planets. A student of Friedrich Bessel, he observed with the famous Königsberg heliometer. In 1853 he published a determination of the parallax of Groombridge 1830.

The son of Franz Wichmann (1776–1850), a councilor at the Celle Higher Court of Appeal, the grandson of pastor and educator Christian Rudolf Karl Wichmann, and the younger brother of painter Adolf Friedrich Georg Wichmann.

After attending the Ernestinum in Celle, Wichmann studied at the University of Göttingen under Carl Friedrich Gauss. There he received an academic prize in 1843 for a thesis in which he treated a problem in spherical geometry.

In 1844, Friedrich Wilhelm Bessel appointed him assistant and observer at the Königsberg Observatory, where he qualified as a professor in 1830 with a thesis on the parallax of the star Groombridge. This parallax led to a heated and somewhat controversial debate with the astronomers at the Russian main observatory in Pulkovo, which would last for many years. In addition to this subject, Wichmann submitted papers on the newly discovered asteroids, the libation of the Moon, and solar prominences.

The asteroid 7103 Wichmann and the Wichmann crater on the Moon were named in his honour.
