= Wayne Waxman =

American philosopher

Education
- Education: University of California, Los Angeles (BA); University of California, Santa Barbara (PhD)
- Thesis: Kant's Model of the Mind (1987)
- Doctoral advisors: Peter Hylton

Philosophical work
- Era: Contemporary philosophy
- Region: Western philosophy
- School: Kantianism
- Institutions: National University of Ireland at Maynooth; University of Colorado, Boulder; New School for Social Research
- Main interests: Early modern philosophy
- Notable ideas: Kant's transcendental idealism as a priori psychologism

Wayne Waxman is an American philosopher, known for his works on early modern philosophy.

== Biography ==
Wayne has studied philosophy from the University of California, Los Angeles, from 1974 to 1976; then acquired BA in philosophy in 1979. He also earned MA in philosophy from the University of California, Santa Barbara in 1983 with his writing Form Before Matter in Kant. In 1987, Wayne completed his PhD from the same university with his research on Kant's Model of the Mind.

He has taught at the National University of Ireland at Maynooth, the University of Colorado, Boulder and the New School for Social Research.

== Books ==
- Kant's Model of the Mind: A New Interpretation of Transcendental Idealism. Oxford: Oxford University Press, 1991.
- Hume's Theory of Consciousness. Cambridge: Cambridge University Press, 1994 (paperback 2003).
- Kant and the Empiricists. Understanding Understanding, Oxford: Oxford University Press, 2005.
- Kant's Anatomy of the Intelligent Mind. The Psychologization of Space, Time, and Nature. Oxford: Oxford University Press, 2013.
- A Guide to Kant's Psychologism: Via Locke, Berkeley, Hume, and Wittgenstein, Routledge, 2019.
