= Siegfried Wichmann =

German art historian

Siegfried Wichmann (10 February 1921 – 6 May 2015) was a German art historian and authority on Japonisme.

== Selected publications ==
- Eduard Schleich der Ältere 1812–1874. München, Phil. F., Diss. v. 11. Sept. 1953
- mit Hans Wichmann: Schach. Ursprung und Wandlung der Spielfigur in zwölf Jahrhunderten, Callwey, München 1960
- Aladin Lampe (Pseudonym): Die Dame und der König : Kulturgeschichte d. Schachspiels. Bruckmann, München 1962
- Manuel Albrecht (Pseudonym): Carl Spitzwegs Malerparadies. Schuler, Stuttgart 1968
- Franz von Lenbach und seine Zeit. DuMont, Köln 1973
- Japonismus: Ostasien – Europa. Begegnungen in der Kunst des 19. und 20. Jahrhunderts. Herrsching 1980
- Julius Seyler – Neuentdeckte Werke, 1988
- Münchner Landschaftsmaler im 19. Jahrhundert. Meister, Schüler, Themen. Seehamer, Weyarn 1996
- Compton. Edward Theodore und Edward Harrison; Maler und Alpinisten. Belser-Verlag, Stuttgart 1999
- Karl Mostböck – der Maler der kodifizierten Form, mit Vorwort von Walter Koschatzky, Einführung Siegfried Wichmann, Spital am Pyrn, 2001
- Carl Spitzweg – Reisen und Wandern in Europa und der Glückliche Winkel. Belser, Stuttgart 2002
- Carl Spitzweg – Verzeichnis der Werke. Gemälde und Aquarelle. Belser, Stuttgart 2002
- mit Christa Habrich: Carl Spitzweg, der Maler und Apotheker. Natur und Naturwissenschaft in seinem Werk. Zur Ausstellung im Deutschen Medizinhistorischen Museum Ingolstadt. Belser, Stuttgart 2003
- Die große Geste im kleinen Format, Der Maler Karl Mostböck, in: Parnass, Kunstmagazin, 2003
- Siegfried Wichmann u.a.: Karl Mostböck, Modulationen in Farbe und Zeichen, Steyr, 2006
- Die Tötung des Königs Ludwig II. von Bayern. Selbstverlag, 2007 ISBN 978-3-00-022234-4
