= Wichmann (crater) =

Crater on the Moon

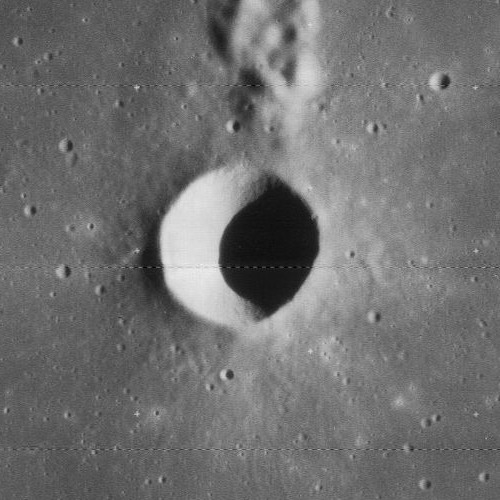
- Lunar Orbiter 4 image
- Coordinates: 7.5°S 38.1°W
- Diameter: 10 km
- Colongitude: 38° at sunrise
- Eponym: Moritz L. G. Wichmann

Wichmann is a bowl-shaped lunar impact crater. It was named after German astronomer Moritz L. G. Wichmann. It is located in the southern half of Oceanus Procellarum on a low plateau formed from a wrinkle ridge, Dorsa Ewing.

There is a small mountain chain to the north that curves away to the west that is designated Wichmann R; this is most likely the rim of a worn crater that was buried by the lava flow forming the mare. Additional low mountains lie to the south of the plateau on which Wichmann is situated.

== Rand McNally's Leon Hills ==
The small mountain chain which is officially known as Wichmann R, north of Wichmann itself, is called Leon Hills on the greenish colored moonmap from Rand McNally. This name, Leon Hills, is also seen on the moonmap in Patrick Moore's Atlas of the Universe (1983). This name was not accepted by the International Astronomical Union (IAU).

== Satellite craters ==
By convention these features are identified on lunar maps by placing the letter on the side of the crater midpoint that is closest to Wichmann.

Wichmann	Latitude	Longitude	Diameter
A	7.4° S	36.9° W	4 km
B	7.1° S	39.1° W	4 km
C	4.7° S	37.4° W	3 km
D	5.4° S	36.0° W	3 km
R	6.6° S	39.0° W	62 km

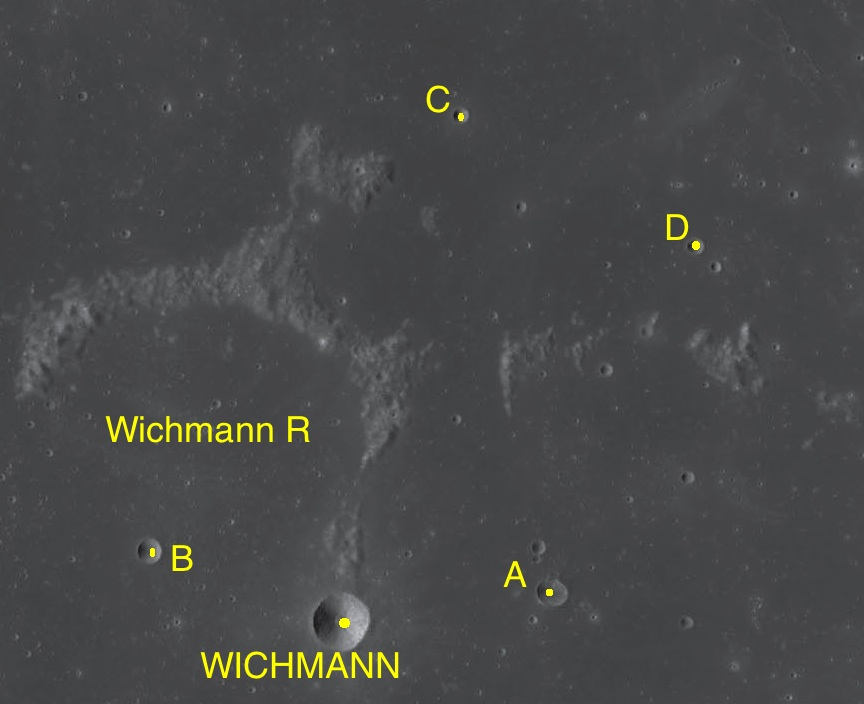
Satellite craters of Wichmann

== Gallery ==
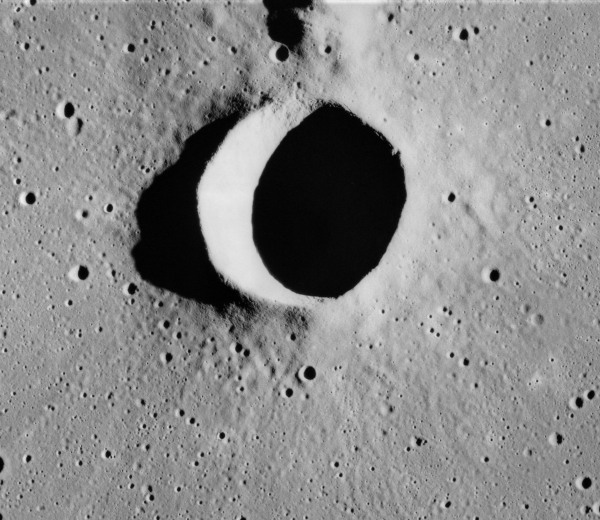
Apollo 16 image

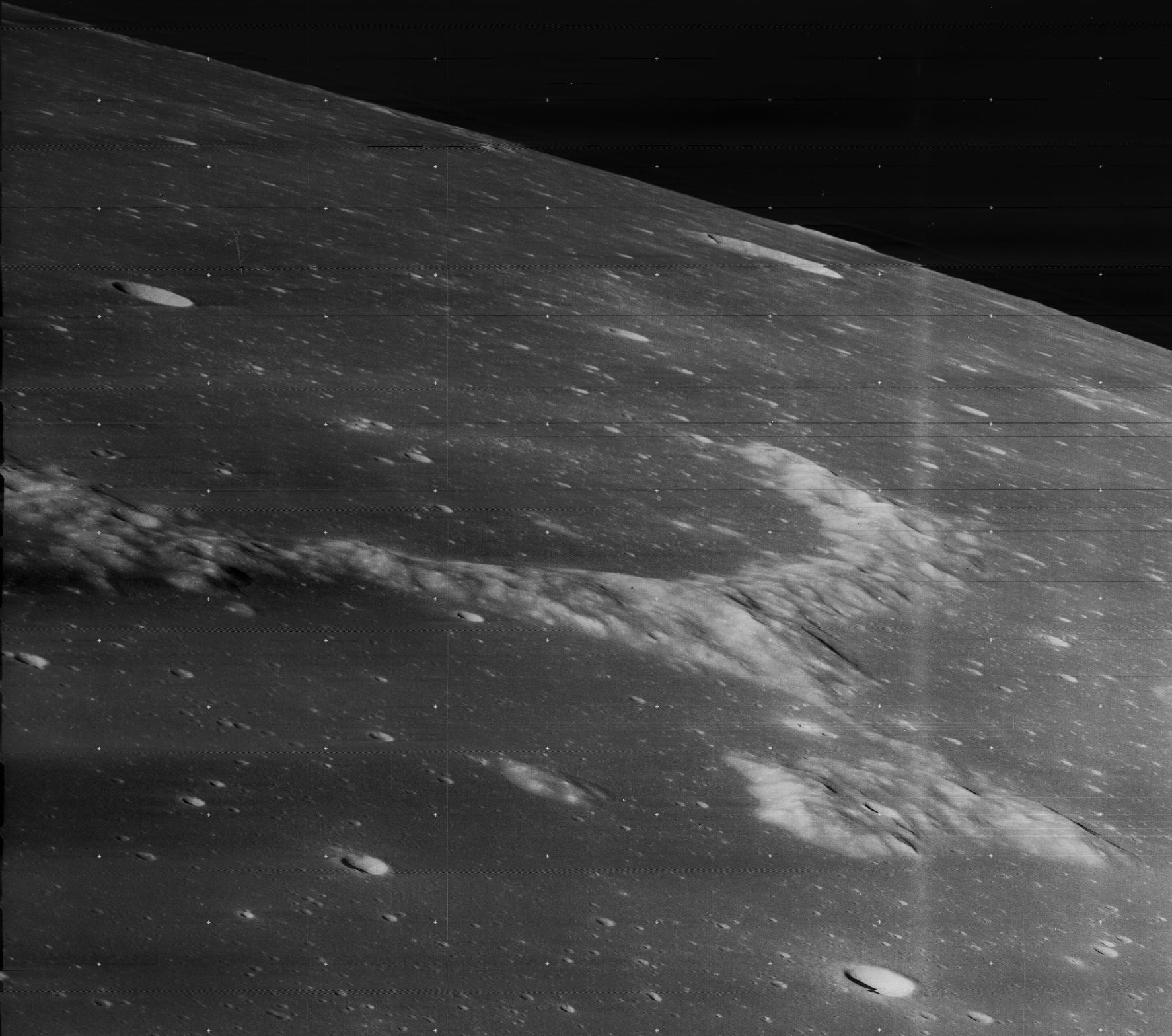
Oblique view of Wichmann R, facing southwest. Wichmann itself is just out of the view to the left. From Lunar Orbiter 3.

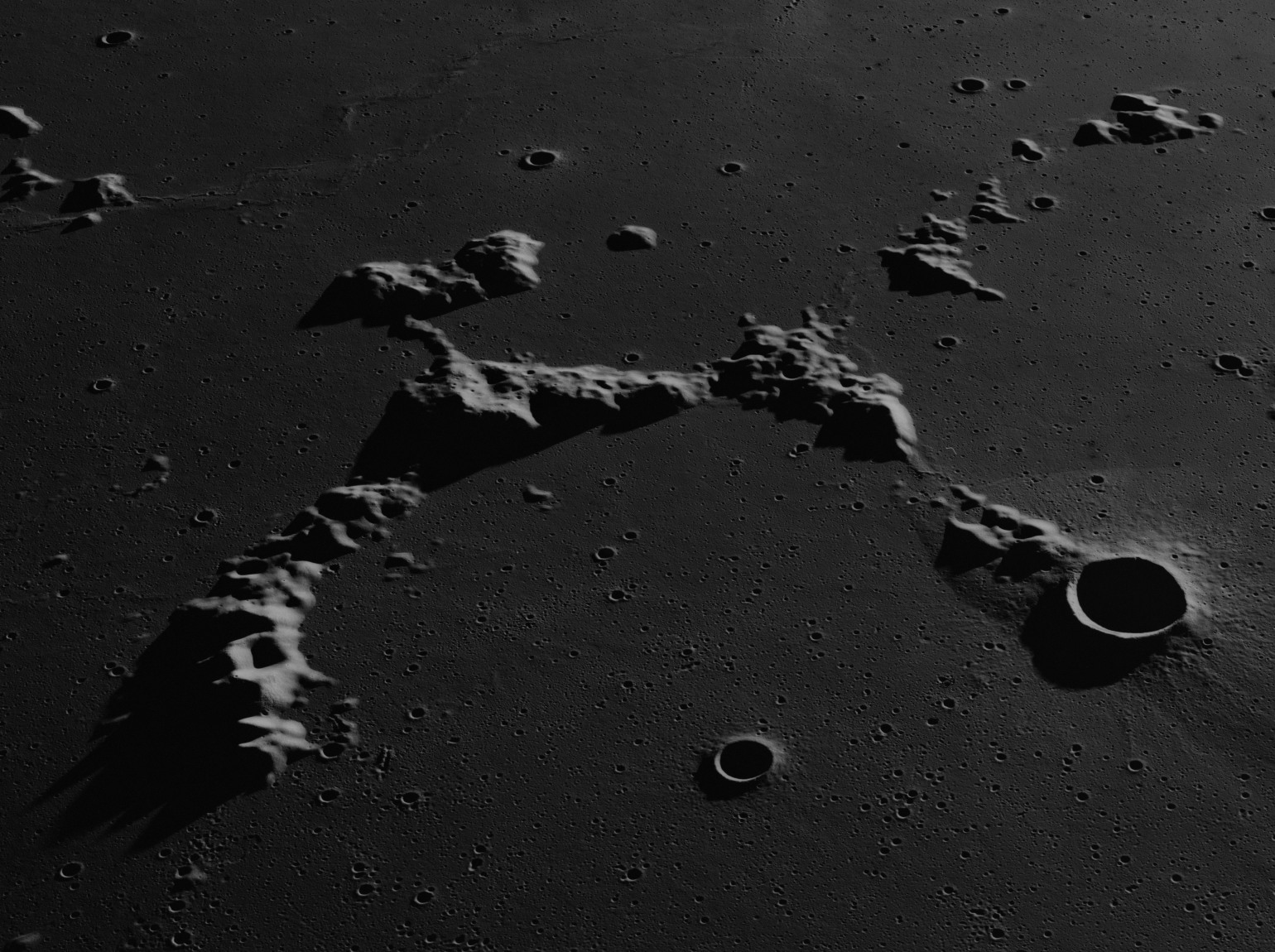
Similar view from Apollo 16
