= Planitia Descensus =

Site of first soft Moon landing

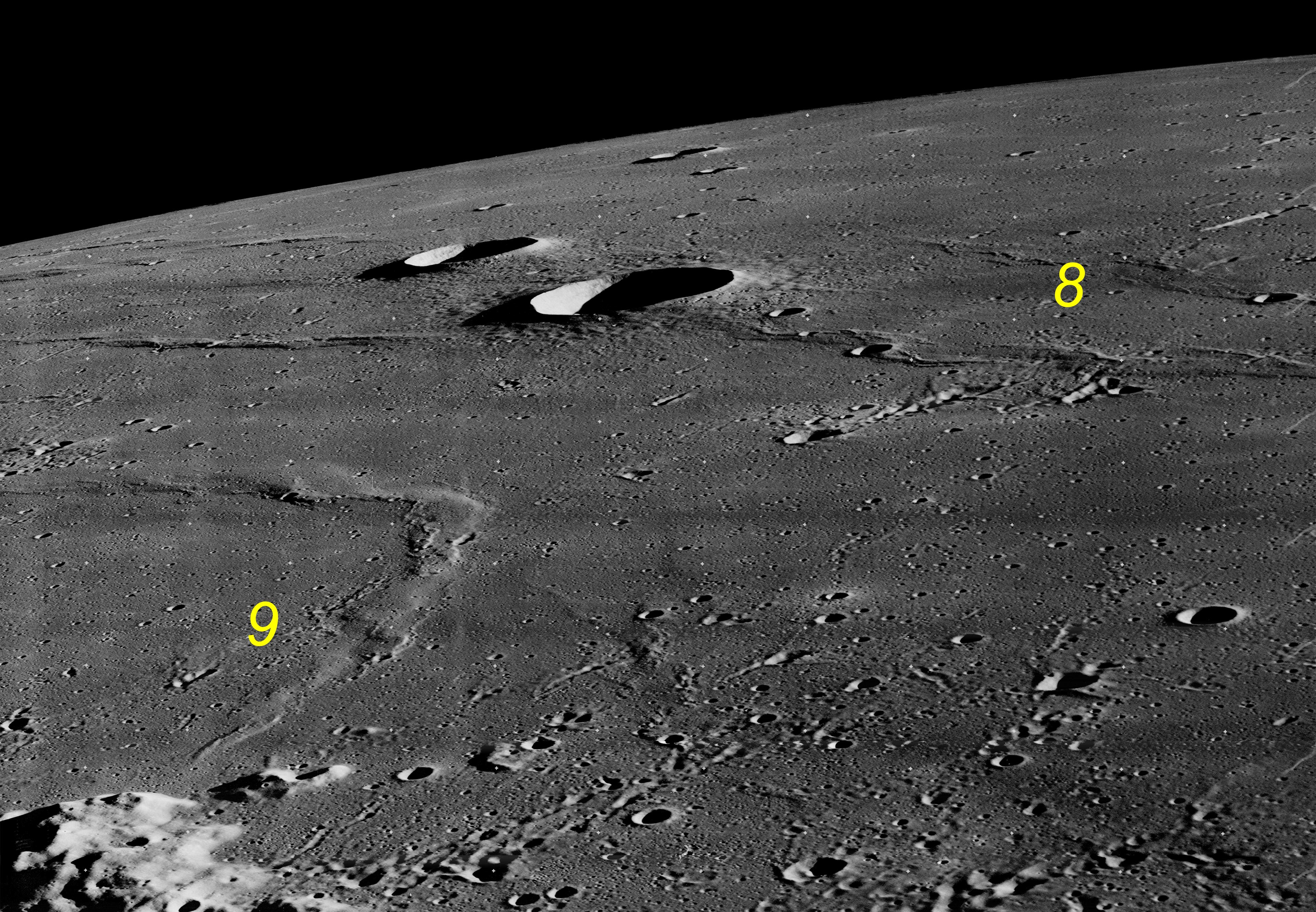
Oblique view of Planitia Descensus, on the moon, facing north. Galilaei crater is the largest crater above center. The approximate locations of the landing sites of Luna 8 and Luna 9 are shown as 8 and 9 respectively.

Planitia Descensus was named to commemorate the site of the first soft landing on the Moon of Luna 9 on 3 February 1966. It is located at Lat. 7.1°N and Long. 64.4W. It is the only officially named plain on the Moon. The Working Group of Commission 17 of the IAU confirmed the name of the site in 1970.
