= Planetary Report =

Magazine

The Planetary Report
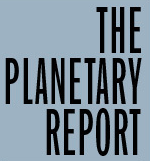
- Editor: Charlene M. Anderson (founding)
- Categories: Planetary science
- Frequency: Quarterly
- Publisher: The Planetary Society
- Founder: Carl Sagan; Bruce Murray; Louis Friedman
- Founded: 1980
- First issue: December 1980
- Country: United States
- Based in: Pasadena, California
- Website: www.planetary.org/explore/the-planetary-report/
- ISSN: 0736-3680

The Planetary Report is a quarterly magazine published by the Planetary Society, featuring articles and photos of Solar System exploration, planetary missions, spacefaring nations, intrepid explorers, planetary science controversies and the latest findings in space exploration and related subjects.

== History and profile ==
The magazine was founded in 1980 by Carl Sagan, Bruce Murray and Louis Friedman. It is an exclusive society membership benefit. The magazine is based in Pasadena, California and was published bimonthly for its first thirty years until it went to quarterly publication in June 2011.

It was edited through June 2018 by Donna Stevens, following previous work by Charlene Anderson and Jennifer Vaughn. Emily Lakdawalla assumed chief editorial responsibilities in September 2018.
