= Harris Schurmeier =

American aerospace engineer (1924–2013)

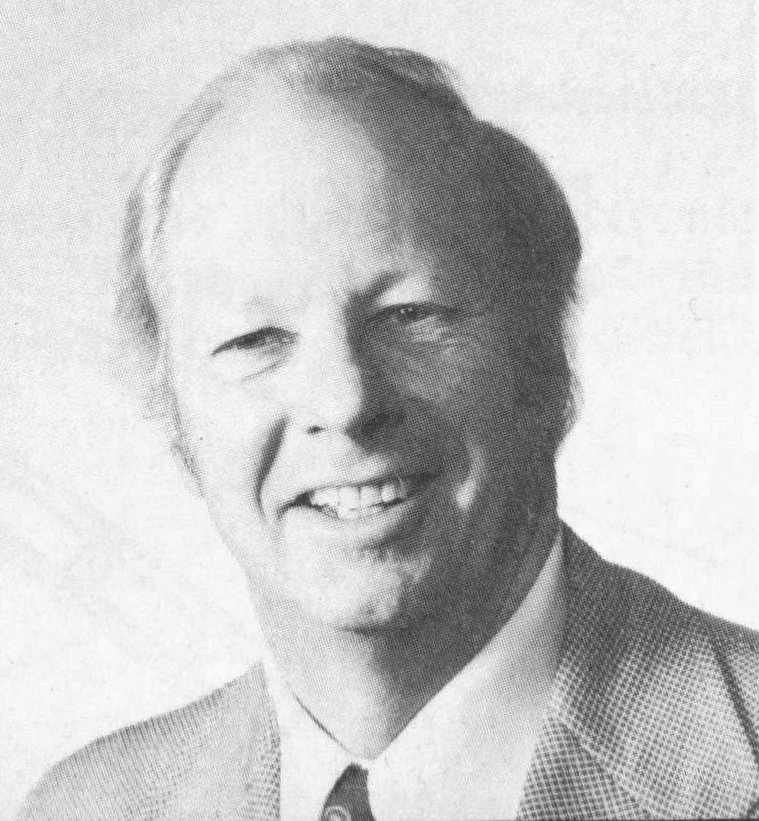
- Schurmeier c. 1980
- Born: July 4, 1924; St. Paul, Minnesota, US
- Died: November 23, 2013 (aged 89)
- Other name: Bud
- Education: Caltech (BS 1945, MS 1948, EngD 1949)
- Scientific career
- Fields: aerospace engineering
- Workplaces: JPL
- Thesis: An Investigation of the Interference Effects of a Sting Support System on the Pressure Distribution over a Body of Revolution (1949)
- Doctoral advisors: Richard William Bell

Harris McIntosh Schurmeier (July 4, 1924 – November 23, 2013) was an American aerospace engineer at the Jet Propulsion Laboratory, best known as the project manager of the Ranger lunar program and Voyager program to the outer planets. After the first six Ranger spacecraft failed, Schurmeier implemented new quality control and testing procedures that led to three consecutive successful missions from 1964 to 1965. He later served as Voyager's first project manager from 1972 to 1976.

== Early life and career ==
Harris McIntosh Schurmeier was born in St. Paul, Minnesota on July 4, 1924. His father was "a pickle manufacturer". The family moved to Winnetka, Illinois when he was a teenager. Schurmeier wanted to become either a pilot or an engineer. He enrolled at Caltech in 1942; in 1945 he received a BS in mechanical engineering and in 1947 became a US Navy pilot. He returned to Caltech and received MS (1948) and engineering degree (1949) in aeronautical engineering.

He worked on wind tunnels, and in 1949 was hired by the JPL to calibrate its new 12-inch supersonic tunnel. He then worked on a design of a 20-inch hypersonic tunnel. In 1960, Schurmeier became the head of the newly created Systems Division; he described its tasks as "all the trajectory work and analytical navigation work ... preliminary design and the design integration of the spacecraft, the job of integration of the spacecraft to the launch vehicle, the responsibility for carrying out the system testing and launch operations and flight operations".

Schurmeier was assigned as a project manager for the failing Ranger Lunar program. The first five Rangers failed, and Schurmeier replaced James Burke with a mandate to change the program. To fix the program, Schurmeier established an independent Quality Assurance Office of 150 personnel and adopted "Mariner's failure reporting system" and its system of "engineering change control and design freezes". Ranger 6 failed, but the next mission, Ranger 7, succeeded and transmitted thousands of photographs; the program continued with successful Ranger 8 and 9 missions.

During the launch of Ranger 7, either Schurmeier or the mission trajectory engineer, Dick Wallace, gave peanuts to the team, nervous about a failure; after the mission success, "lucky peanuts" became a JPL tradition:

He figured that chewing on something or just fidgeting with them on the table would give his team something else to focus on. Everyone knew that another failure might kill Ranger and JPL. Distraction was key. With peanuts on desks and in hands, engineers watched as telemetry from the spacecraft came back. ... The stunning success of Ranger 7 had nothing to do with peanuts, but it's been a tradition for the legume to be on hand for every major mission event — launches, landings, and orbit insertion burns.

After that Schurmeier became the project manager for the Mariner 6 and 7 missions to Mars (1969); then a project manager for Voyager program mission to the outer Solar System (1972–1976). He invited Caltech professor Edward C. Stone to become Voyager's project scientist; Stone held this role for 50 years, from 1972 to 2022.

Louis Friedman, a friend of both Stone and Schurmeier, who was involved in the Grand Tour program planning before it was transformed into Voyager, acknowledged Schurmeier's role in the program

Bud Schurmeier was a phenomenal person. He is the one who made the mission happen – he and his teams: spacecraft and mission. Ed without Bud wouldn't have done anything, and Bud without Ed wouldn't have achieved the great results. But either of them without the support of the rest of the teams would also have not been able to do it alone. Voyager has many heroes. None, more than Bud Schurmeier.

In April 1976, before the Voyagers were launched, Schurmeier was promoted to JPL's assistant laboratory director for civil systems, which later became JPL's Defense and Civil Programs. Schurmeier led it until his retirement in 1985.

Schurmeier remained active after his retirement: he was on the Galileo mission's standing review board, on the W. M. Keck Observatory project review board, and participated in The Planetary Society's projects (Mars Balloon, Mars Rover), and was a leading systems engineer for its solar sail proof-of-concept Cosmos 1 and LightSail projects.

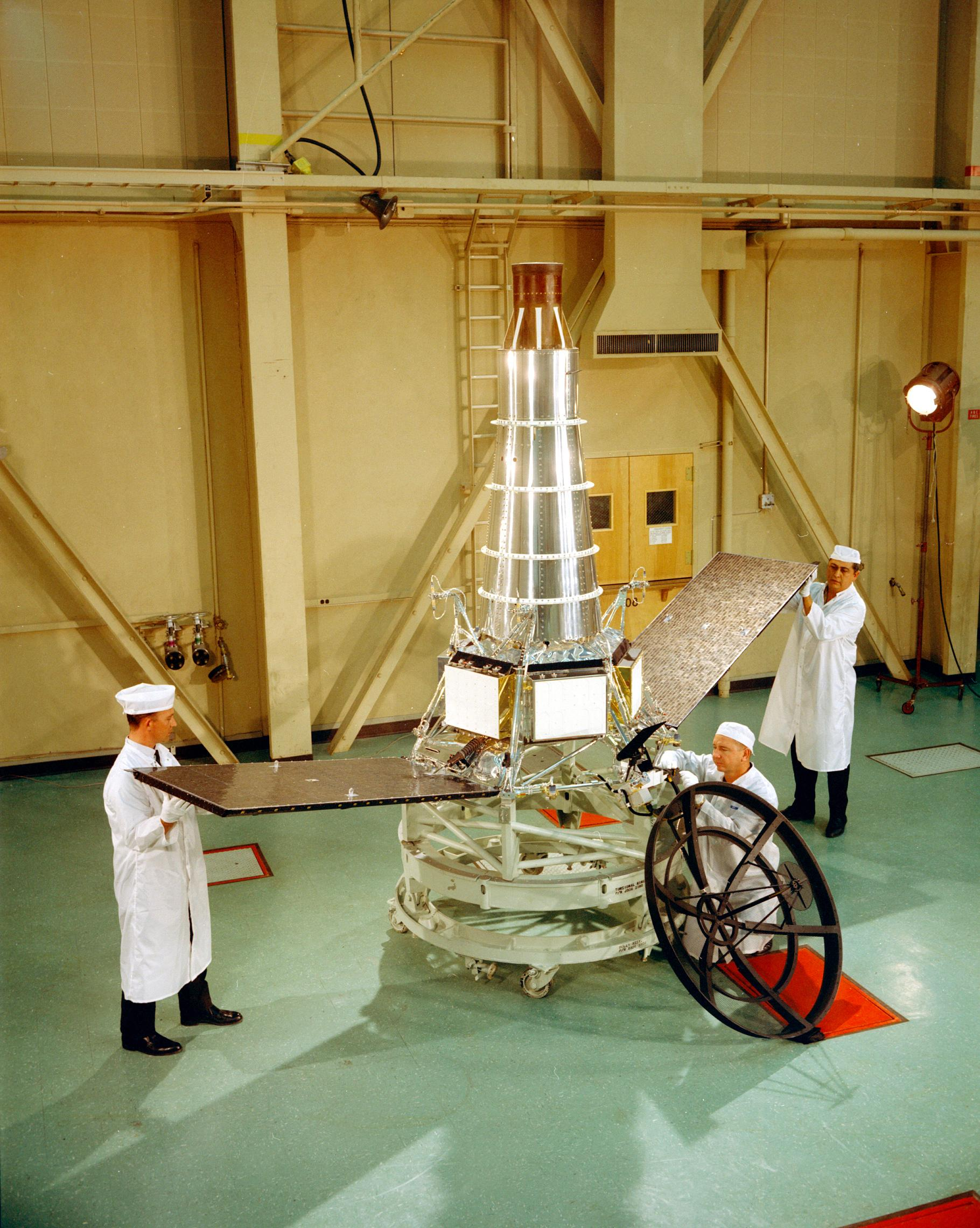
Ranger 7

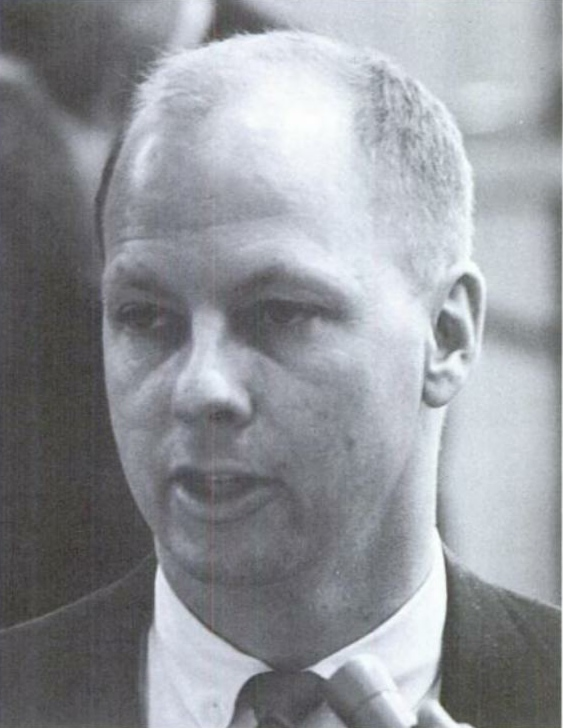
JPL Ranger Project Manager Harris Schurmeier, c. 1967

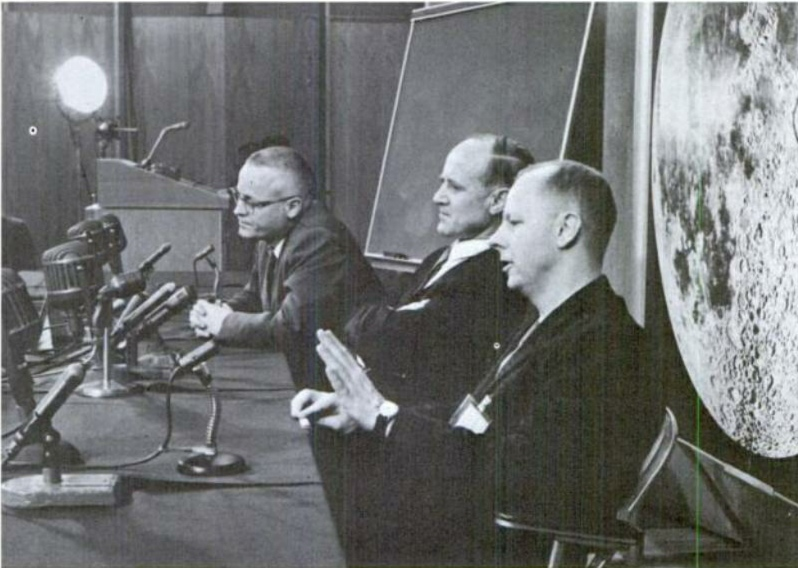
Homer Newell, William Pickering, and Harris Schurmeier answer newsmen's questions at Ranger 6 Postflight Press Conference

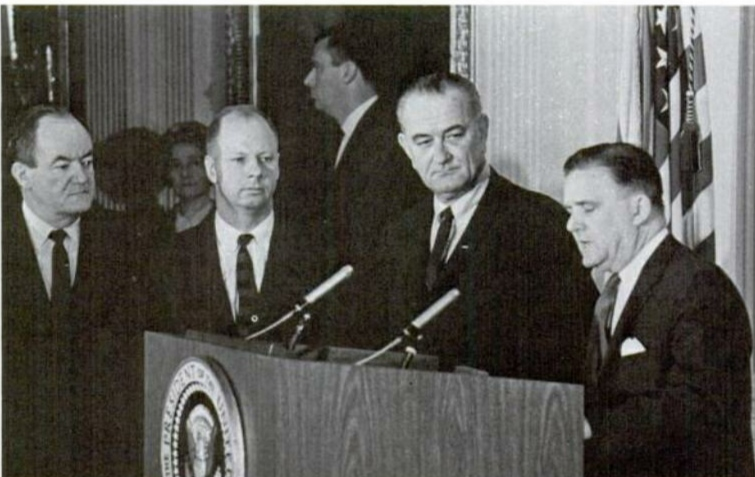
White House Awards Ceremony. Left to Right: Vice-president Hubert Humphrey, Ranger Project Manager Schurmeier, President Lyndon Johnson, NASA Administrator James E. Webb

== Personal life ==
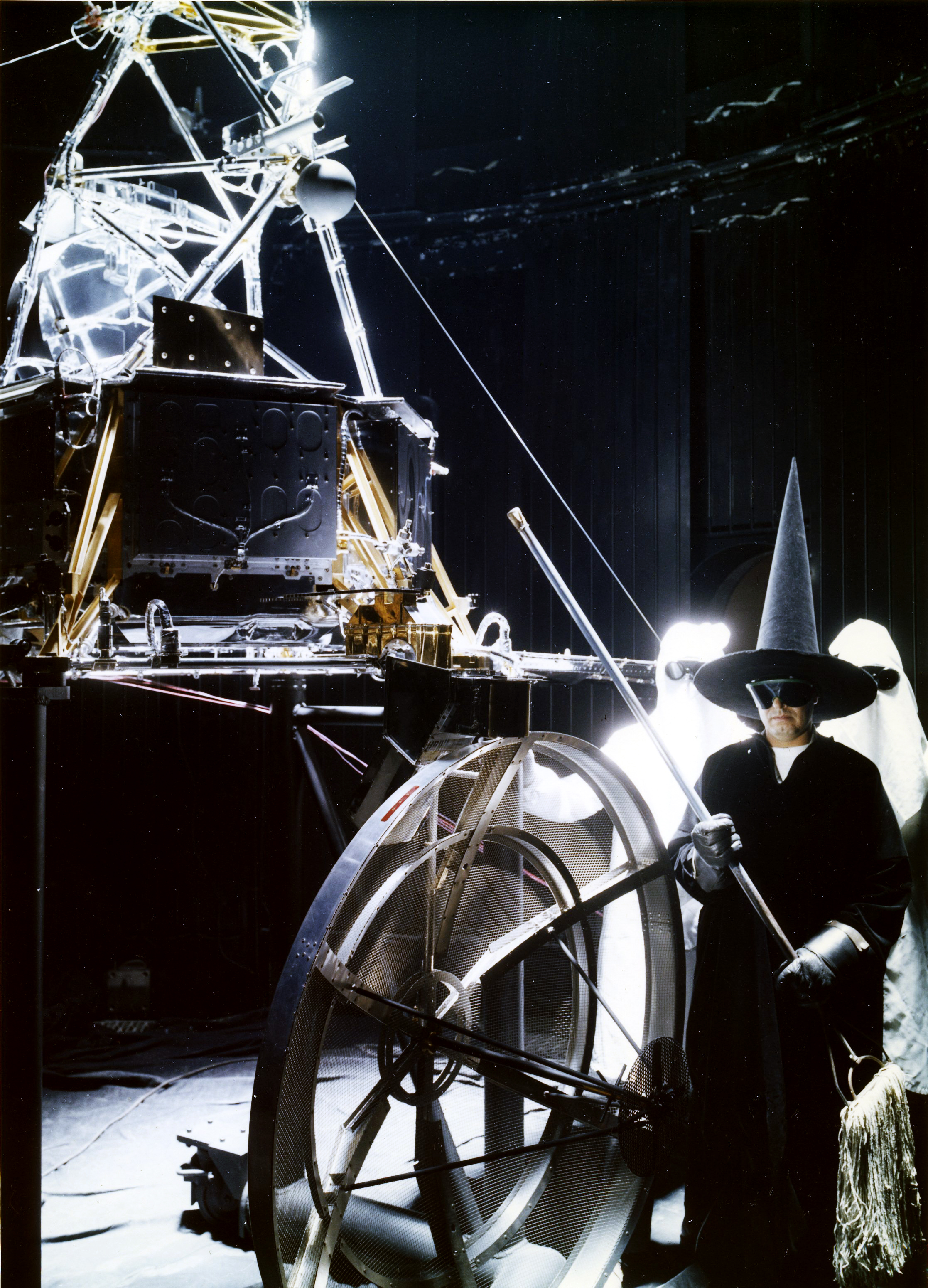
Ranger Project Manager, Harris M. Schurmeier, posing with Ranger II as a wizard with two bunny-suited ghost friends standing behind him (JPL was founded on October 31, the day of Halloween)

Schurmeier was described in 1964 as "[the one] who looks, behaves and thinks much like a ground-bound astronaut", who had "a cheerful, softspoken, unassuming personality that nevertheless is incisive and imperturbable". JPL director William H. Pickering once called Schurmeier "a very well behaved young man".

Schurmeier was an experienced pilot, flight instructor, motor gliderist, a surfer, a skier, and a sailor. In 1964, The New York Times article described his hobbies as: "he is a leader of a laboratory clique known as "The Syndicate". Its members spent weekends on such projects as building "hot-rod" catamaran boats loaded, often to the dunking point, with mast and sail."

After retirement, he became an avocado farmer and a utilities commissioner in Oceanside, California. He met his wife Betty Jo Parris in 1949, when she was a mathematician working on a wind tunnel; she died in 2009. They had four children.

== Awards ==
- 1965 NASA Exceptional Scientific Achievement Medal
- 1969 NASA Exceptional Service Medal
- 1973 a fellow of the American Institute of Aeronautics and Astronautics
- 1981 NASA Distinguished Service Medal
- 1983 elected to the National Academy of Engineering

He was also a member of the Supersonic Tunnel Association, the American Association for the Advancement of Science, and Sigma Xi.

== Selected publications ==
- Schurmeier, H. (1968). "The mission of Mariner Mars '69". 5th Annual Meeting and Technical Display. doi:10.2514/6.1968-1050.
- Schurmeier, H. (January 1974). Management and design of long-life systems; Proceedings of the Symposium, Denver, Colo., April 24–26, 1973.
- Schurmeier, H. M. (1975). "Planetary exploration - Earth's new horizon /12th von Karman Lecture/". Journal of Spacecraft and Rockets. 12 (7): 385–405. doi:10.2514/3.27843.
- Burke, James D.; Schurmeier, Harris M. (2012). "Chapter 10. Ranger: Circumstances, Events, Legacy". In Linda Billings (ed.). 50 Years of Solar System Exploration. Historical Perspectives. NASA.
