= Bradford A. Smith =

American astronomer (1931–2018)

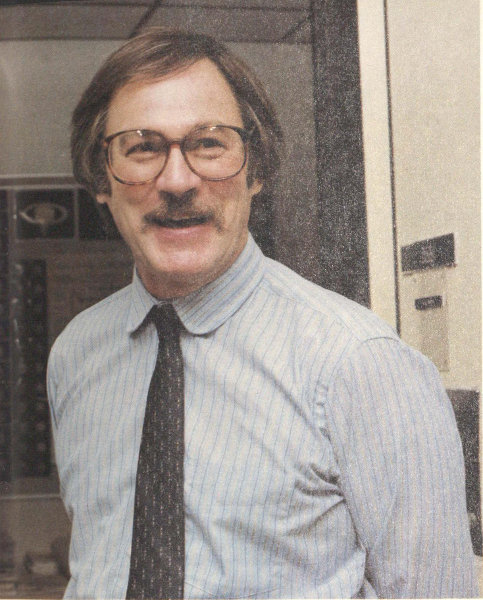
- Smith in c. 1980
- Born: September 22, 1931; Cambridge, Massachusetts, US
- Died: July 3, 2018 (aged 86); Santa Fe, New Mexico, US
- Education: Northeastern University (BSc 1954); New Mexico State University (PhD 1973)
- Known for: Voyager imaging team leader
- Scientific career
- Fields: Planetary astronomy, astronomical imaging
- Workplaces: University of Arizona, New Mexico State University
- Thesis: Observations of atmospheric limb-darkening in the visual continuum and an analysis of multiple scattering in the atmospheres of Jupiter and Saturn (1973)
- Doctoral advisors: Herbert Alonzo Beebe

Bradford Adelbert Smith (September 22, 1931 – July 3, 2018) was an American astronomer who led the imaging team for NASA's Voyager missions and made multiple contributions to planetary astronomy and astronomical imaging techniques. He was instrumental in capturing images of the outer planets and their moons during the Voyager encounters and was the first person to directly image a protoplanetary disk around another star.

== Early life and education ==
Bradford Adelbert Smith was born on 22 September 1931, the eldest of three sons of Percival and Mary Smith, in Cambridge, Massachusetts. He spent his childhood in Winchester, where his ancestors were farmers. Percival Smith had a leather tanning business, and young Bradford became interested in chemistry helping his father; his interest in bombs led to the FBI visit. He was also interested in astronomy, and often visited the Harvard College Observatory, but decided to study chemistry. He got his BSc (1954) in chemical engineering from Northeastern University and then joined the army, where he served as an astronomer at the White Sands Missile Range in New Mexico. He was assigned as a liaison to Clyde Tombaugh, the discoverer of Pluto.

== Career ==
Smith's first astronomical project involved collaborating with Tombaugh at Lowell Observatory on a search for potential natural satellites of the Moon during the November 1956 lunar eclipse. Smith left the army after two years and followed Tombaugh to New Mexico State University (NMSU), where he helped to establish a "systematic, ground-based telescopic imaging of the planets" in 1958, designed to support NASA's emerging planetary missions. Smith was the head of the Planetary Group. At first, he used a 12-inch telescope installed at his backyard.

The other side of planetary exploration is that the romance is lost. Objects like Halley's comet have a romantic mystique. You see them up close and they still have scientific interest, but they lose their mystery. Poor Halley has joined the ranks of being just another celestial body instead of a phenomenon.

— Bradford Smith after the Vega mission to Halley's Comet

Smith participated in numerous space missions. He worked on Mariner 6 and 7, and later became a deputy team leader for the imaging investigation on Mariner 9, which in 1971 became the first spacecraft to orbit another planet. He also contributed to NASA's Viking 1 and Viking 2 missions to Mars, the Soviet Union's Phobos 1 and Phobos 2 missions to Mars, the Vega 1 and Vega 2 missions to Halley's Comet, and the Hubble Space Telescope's Wide Field/Planetary Camera. He worked on NASA's missions without a PhD, but after a friend's advice earned his PhD in 1973 - NMSU's first doctorate awarded in astronomy. In 1974, he moved to the University of Arizona's Lunar and Planetary Laboratory and Steward Observatory.

Smith was the leader of the imaging team for the Voyager program to outer solar system from 1972 to 1989. The Voyager missions provided first close-up views of Jupiter, Saturn, Uranus, and Neptune, along with their complex systems of moons and rings. Under Smith's direction, the imaging team documented multiple discoveries, including active volcanism on Io, the complex structure of Saturn's rings, and the diverse geology of the outer planet moons. Smith became the public face of these discoveries, serving as a spokesperson. Smith advocated for modifications to the Voyager camera systems to increase its focal length to obtain better images of planetary rings and moons, recognizing that these bodies might prove as scientifically interesting as the planets themselves. He also expanded the imaging team to include experts in geology and planetary rings, as well as scientists from France and USSR (André Brahic and Alexander Basilevsky). He invited several women, including Carolyn Porco, to the team; Porco later served as Cassini's imaging lead.

The New York Times obituary described his role in Voyager program as:

Bradford Smith ... extended humanity's vision to look boldly where no eyes had ever looked as head of the camera team for the Voyager mission, hopscotching from one weird world to the next across the solar system and discovering prospects for alien life ... Under the gaze of Dr. Smith's cameras, nature revealed propensities and potentials undreamt of on Earth in what had been thought of as the frozen silent depths of time.

Smith was a pioneer in adopting electronic detectors for astronomical observations. In 1976, he became the first who used a charge-coupled device (CCD) detector on a telescope to produce the first high-resolution infrared images of Uranus and Neptune. In 1984, Smith, together with Richard Terrile, used a coronagraph on the star Beta Pictoris, and get the first photograph of a protoplanetary disk around it.

Smith retired in 1991 and moved to Hawaii, where he worked at the University of Hawaii. In 2001 he moved to Santa Fe, where he worked in wild bird rehabilitation center.

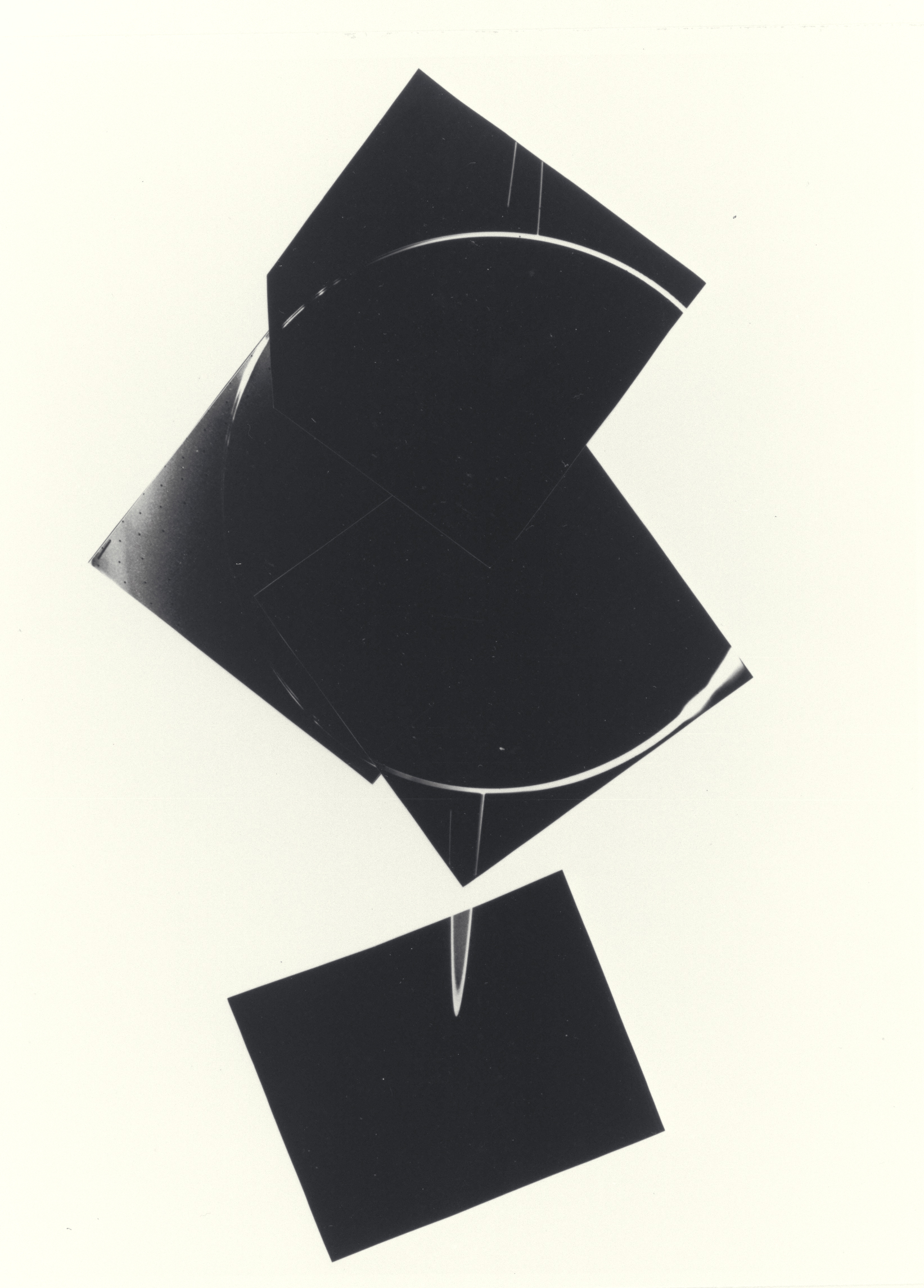
Rings of Jupiter as seen by Voyager 1

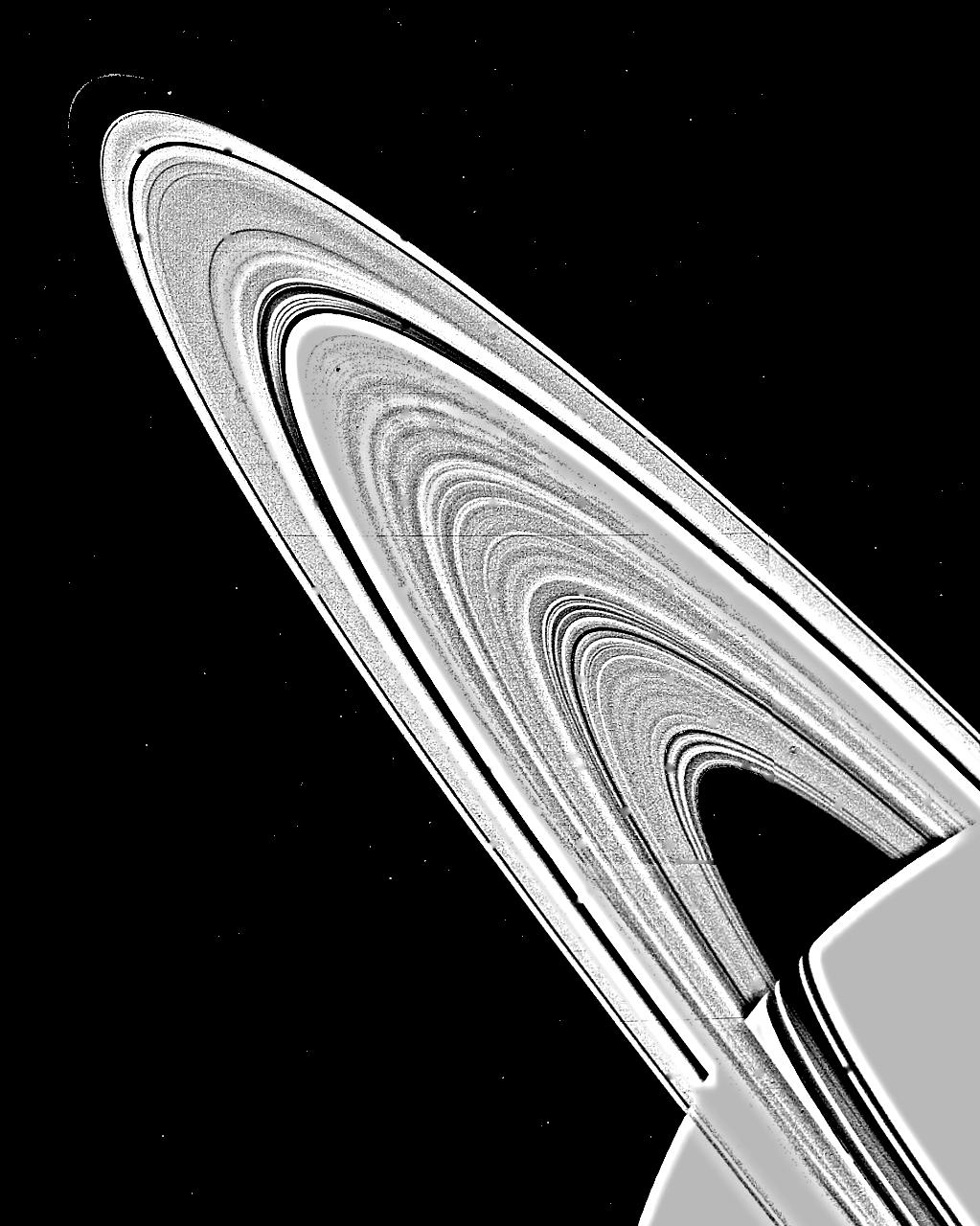
Rings of Saturn as seen by Voyager

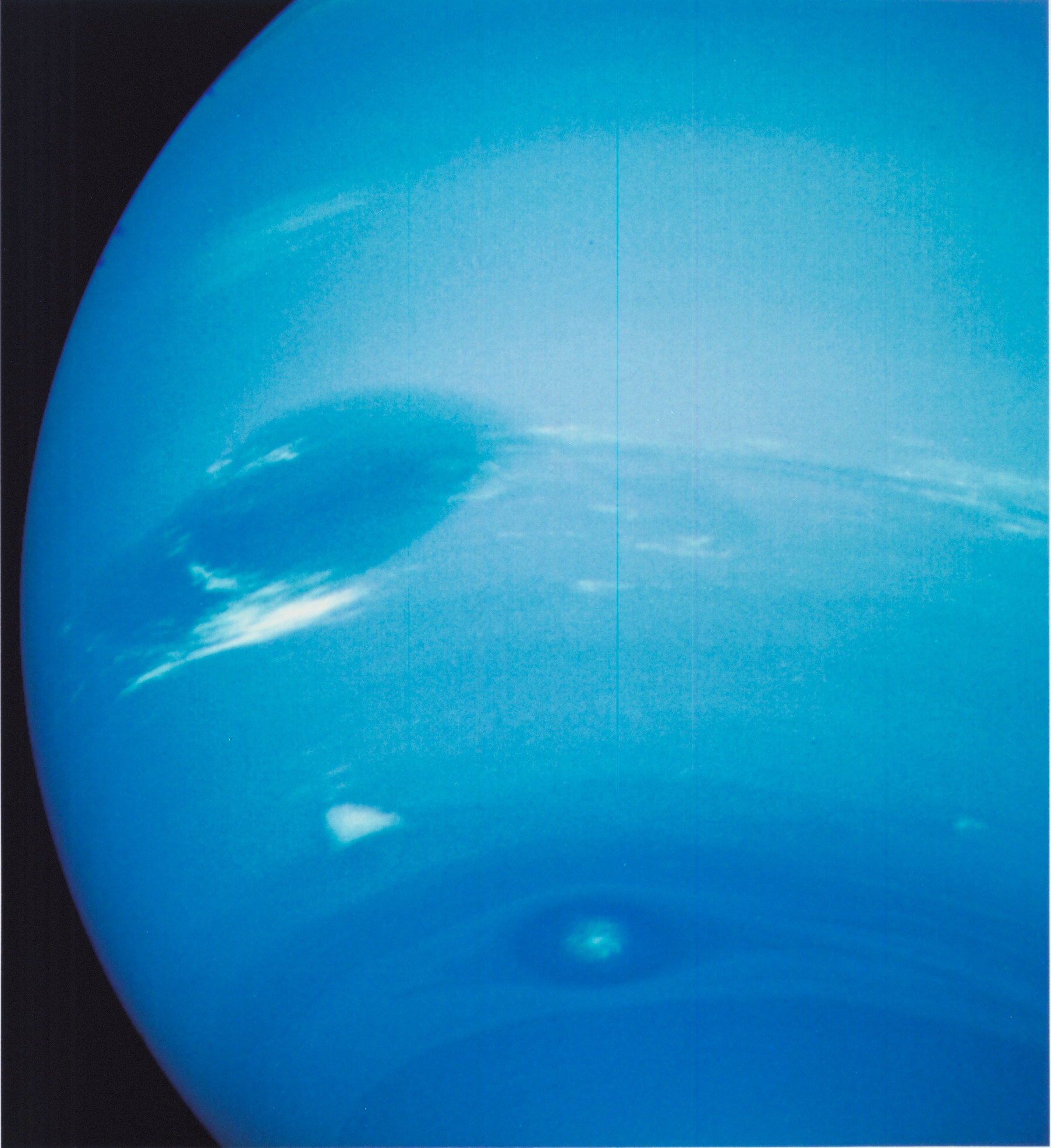
Neptune by Voyager 2

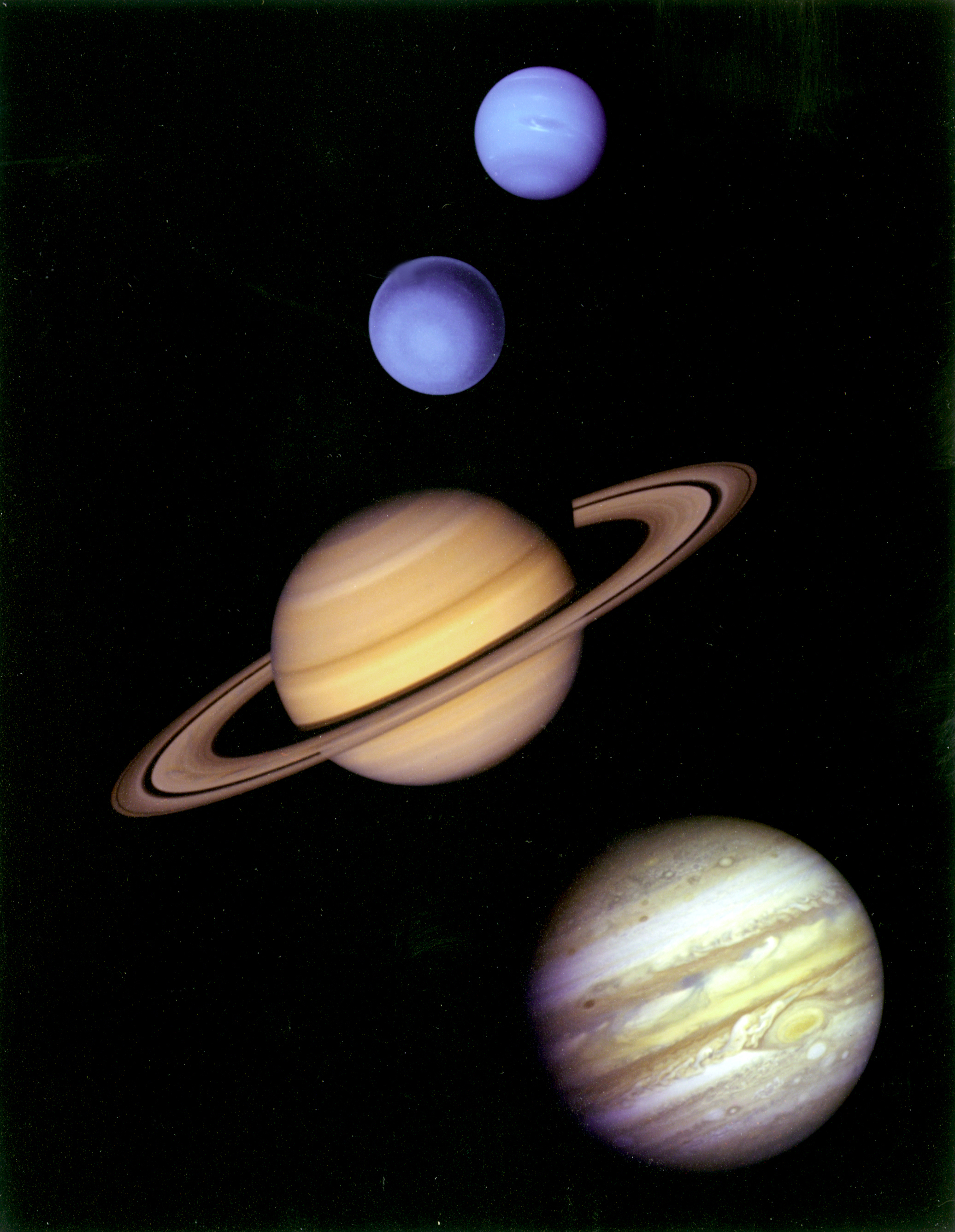
Montage of four planets visited by Voyager

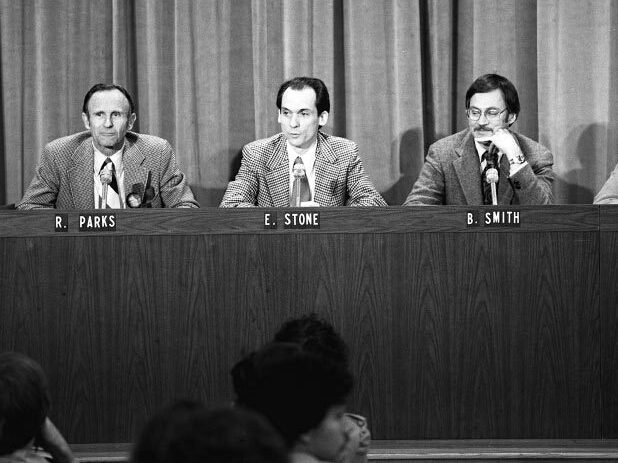
Project manager Robert J. Parks, Project scientist Edward C. Stone, and Smith at Voyager's Saturn flyby press conference

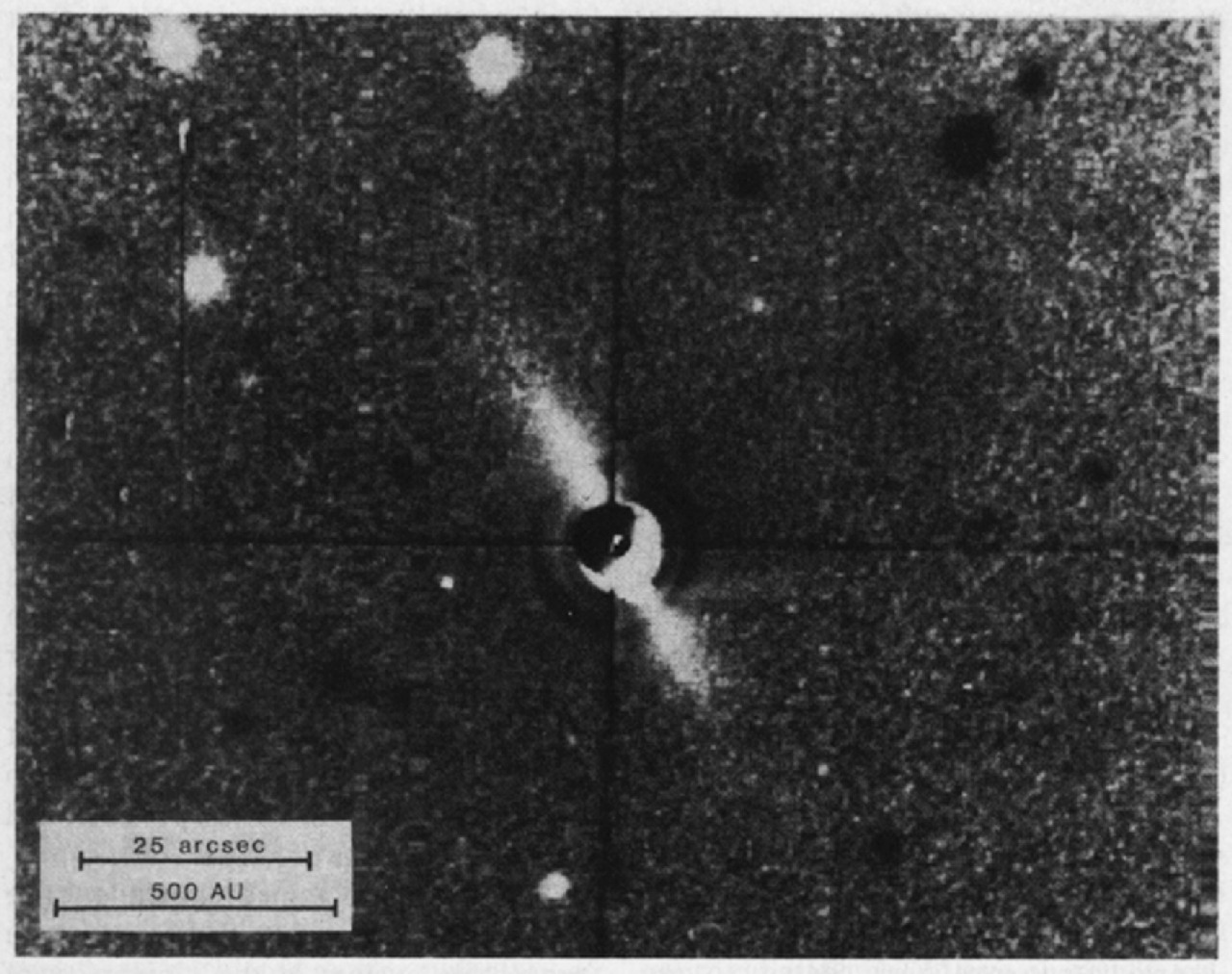
Beta Pictoris protoplanetary disc, imaged by Smith and Terrile in 1984

== Personal life and legacy ==
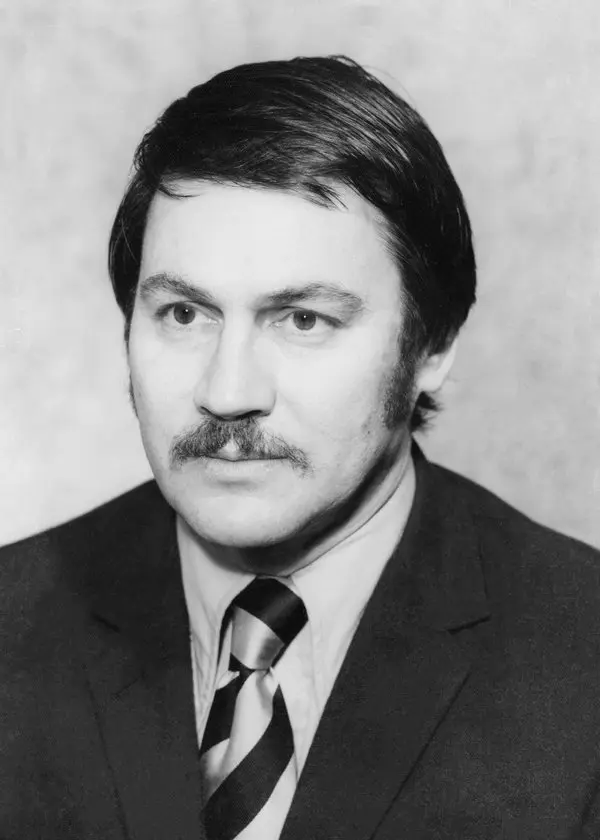
Bradford A. Smith in 1971

Smith was described as "an avuncular, gravelly-voiced astronomer". According to his colleague Carolyn Porco, Smith "had a reputation for being unapproachable and intimidating" but was "a gentleman, loved by many for his encouragement, open-mindedness, and willingness to listen". He was married three times and had three children from his first marriage. He died at his home in Santa Fe on July 3, 2018, from complications related to myasthenia gravis.

Carolyn Porco described Smith's legacy in her obituary:

A long, risky undertaking to journey to the outer planets and beyond the solar system, Voyager became iconic in its scope and significance—more rite of passage than expedition, more mythic than scientific. The extraordinary images of alien worlds and stunning marvels, so unexpected, and that precognitive sense of being there that they evoked were the means by which laypeople the world over felt connected to a grand pilgrimage, with Brad as head pilgrim, rendering meaning along the way. And he excelled at it: He was well-spoken, commanding, knowledgeable, and witty.

== Recognition and honors ==
Smith received the NASA Exceptional Scientific Achievement Medal four times in recognition of his contributions to planetary science. Asteroid 8553 was named "Bradsmith" in his honor.

== Selected publications ==
Books

- Strom, Stephen E.; Smith, Bradford A. (2015). Earth and Mars: A Reflection. The University of Arizona Press. ISBN 9780816500383.
- Palen, Stacy; Kay, Laura; Smith, Bradford; Blumenthal, George (2014). Understanding our Universe (2 ed.). ISBN 978-0-393-93631-5.
- Kay, Laura; Palen, Stacy; Smith, Bradford; Blumenthal, George (2013). 21st Century Astronomy (4 ed.). W. W. Norton. ISBN 978-0393918786.

Articles

- Smith, Bradford A.; Soderblom, Laurence A.; et al. (June 1979). "The Jupiter System Through the Eyes of Voyager 1". Science. 204 (4396): 951–972. Bibcode:1979Sci...204..951S. doi:10.1126/science.204.4396.951. ISSN 0036-8075. PMID 17800430.
- Smith, Bradford A.; Soderblom, Laurence A.; et al. (23 November 1979). "The Galilean Satellites and Jupiter: Voyager 2 Imaging Science Results". Science. 206 (4421): 927–950. Bibcode:1979Sci...206..927S. doi:10.1126/science.206.4421.927. ISSN 0036-8075. PMID 17733910.
- Smith, Bradford A.; Soderblom, Laurence; et al. (10 April 1981). "Encounter with Saturn: Voyager 1 Imaging Science Results". Science. 212 (4491): 163–191. Bibcode:1981Sci...212..163S. doi:10.1126/science.212.4491.163. ISSN 0036-8075. PMID 17783827.
- Smith, Bradford A.; Terrile, Richard J. (21 December 1984). "A Circumstellar Disk Around β Pictoris". Science. 226 (4681): 1421–1424. doi:10.1126/science.226.4681.1421.
- Smith, Bradford A.; Soderblom, Laurence; et al. (4 July 1986). "Voyager 2 in the Uranian System: Imaging Science Results". Science. 233 (4759): 43–64. Bibcode:1986Sci...233...43S. doi:10.1126/science.233.4759.43. ISSN 0036-8075. PMID 17812889.
- Smith, Bradford A.; Soderblom, Laurence; et al. (15 December 1989). "Voyager 2 at Neptune: Imaging Science Results". Science. 246 (4936): 1422–1449. Bibcode:1989Sci...246.1422S. doi:10.1126/science.246.4936.1422. ISSN 0036-8075. PMID 17755997.
- Smith, Bradford A. (1992). "Voyager: A Retrospective". Highlights of Astronomy. 9: 33–42. doi:10.1017/S1539299600008728.
