= P. Devadas =

Indian astronomer

- Born: 1923
- Died: 2015; Chennai, India
- Known for: Amateur astronomer

Professor P. Devadas (c. 1923 – 18 December 2015) was an amateur astronomer from India.

A fellow of the Royal Astronomical Society and a member of the British Astronomical Association, the Astronomical Society of India, the Planetary Society and the Optical Society of India, Devadas headed the Tamil Nadu Astronomy Association. He taught observational and practical astronomy and astrophysics to school and college students visiting the Tamil Nadu Science and Technology Centre, where he was called upon to give lectures.

A recipient of the Tamil Nadu State Award for popularising science, Devadas manufactured astronomical telescopes and established an engineering firm in Chennai for the production of telescopes in India. The instruments are being supplied to research institutions, university departments, colleges, schools and amateurs.

Devadas died aged 92 at his home in Guindy on 18 December 2015.
