= James Burke (space engineer) =

American space engineer (1925–2023)

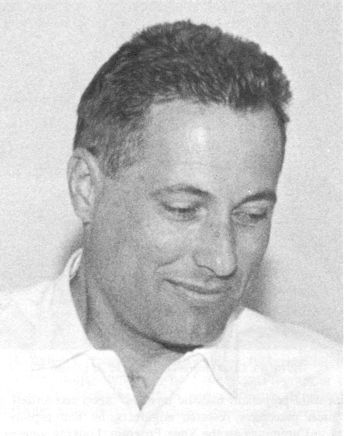
- Burke in 1960
- Born: James Donahue Burke; September 18, 1925; Los Angeles County, California, U.S.
- Died: August 19, 2023 (aged 97)
- Known for: Ranger program, one of the pioneers of America's space program
- Scientific career
- Fields: Astrodynamics
- Workplaces: JPL

James Donahue Burke (September 18, 1925 – August 19, 2023) was an American lunar settlement and exploration expert. He was known for being the first manager of the Ranger program, and considered one of the pioneers of America's space program.

== Early life and career ==
James Donahue Burke was born in Los Angeles County on September 18, 1925. He grew up in Claremont, California and graduated from Webb High School in 1942.

In 1945, after graduating in mechanical engineering from California Institute of Technology, he became a U.S. naval aviator. Burke returned to Caltech to receive his MSc in aeronautics, before working for JPL in 1949.

In his time at JPL, Burke was the Vega program director, developing the third stage of the general-purpose Vega launch vehicle, which was based on the Atlas rocket.

Following JPL's transfer from the U.S. Navy to NASA, and reorganization during early 1960, the Lunar and Planetary Program was created. Burke was named deputy of the Lunar Program under Clifford Cummings, before becoming the Ranger Spacecraft Project Manager as well.

== Ranger program ==
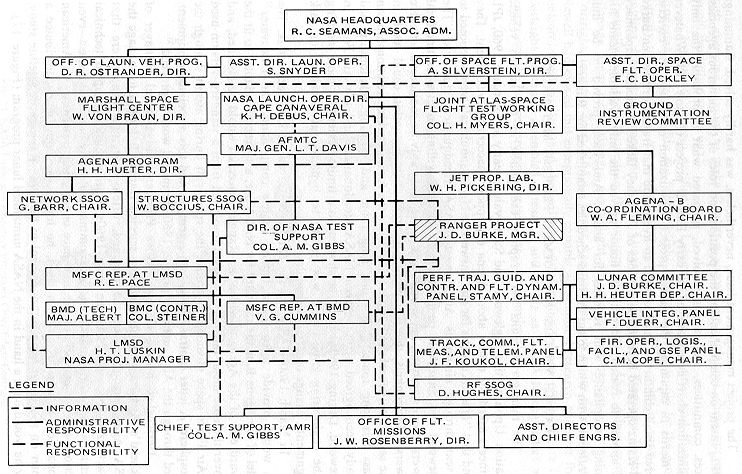
Ranger program organization chart, Burke is highlighted

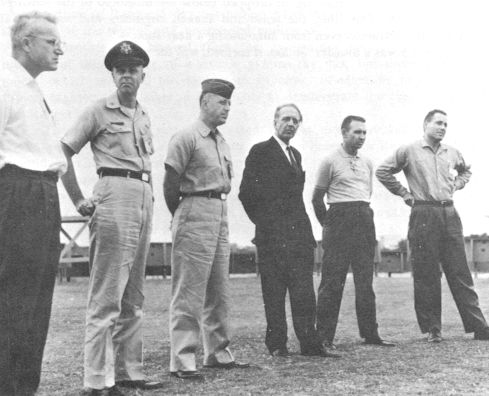
Ranger program officials assembled for the Ranger 5 postlaunch press conference at Cape Canaveral. Left to right: Friedrich Duerr, Major J. Mulladay, Lt. Col. Jack Albert, Kurt Debus, William Cunningham, and James Burke

Burke was the first program manager of the Ranger program, a series of unmanned space missions by the United States in the 1960s whose objective was to obtain the first close-up images of the surface of the Moon. The Ranger spacecraft were designed to take images of the lunar surface, transmitting those images to Earth until the spacecraft were destroyed upon impact. Burke was in charge of spacecraft design, deep space tracking and control network, space flight operations and data reduction support systems, while the Space Science Division was in charge of the scientific experiments. Burke could combine the technological and theoretical to integrate mechanical and electrical features to achieve the difficult technical objectives. Along with his two associates, Burke had solved the major guidance problem, velocity control, associated with solid-propellant ballistic missiles. He was recognized as one of the laboratory's most perceptive research engineers, and advanced to become deputy to Cummings on the Vega Program.

Technical challenges led to the failure of the first six flights. Following the first five failures, Harris M. Schurmeier became project manager. The ranger program suffered an additional failure before Ranger 7 was successful.

Burke participated in many other lunar, planetary, and astrophysical projects. He was a member of the human-powered flight team that won the Kremer prize.

Burke continued to work at JPL until his retirement in 2001.

Minor planet 4874 Burke, discovered by Eleanor Helin, was named after him when he retired from JPL.

== Outreach and education ==
Burke was a faculty member of the International Space University from 1989.

Burke and his wife Caroline were advisers at the founding conference of the Space Generation Advisory Council during UNISPACE III in Vienna and participated in many Space Generation activities. Burke was an honorary board member of SGAC.

Burke was involved with the Planetary Society from the beginning. He was the technical editor of newsletter, "The Planetary Report" for many years.

== Death ==
James Burke died on August 19, 2023, at the age of 97.

== Selected publications ==
Burke had over 129 works in 165 publications

- Burke, J, Brereton, R, Muller, P. 1970," Desert Stream Channels resembling Lunar Sinuous Rilles". In Nature, Vol. 225, 23 March, pp1234–1236, (28 March 1970); doi:10.1038/2251234a0
- Burke, J. 1985, "Merits of a Lunar Polar Base Location". In Mendell, W. (Ed.). Lunar Bases and Space Activities of the 21st Century, Lunar and Planetary Institute.
- Burke, J. 2001, "Moon". In Encyclopædia Britannica, 24th edition.
- Burke, J. 2008, "Moon". In McGraw-Hill Encyclopedia of Science and Technology, 10th ed.
