= Mars and the Mind of Man =

1973 book

- 1973 book jacket
- Author: Ray Bradbury; Arthur C. Clarke; Bruce C. Murray; Carl Sagan; Walter Sullivan
- Language: English
- Genre: Non-fiction
- Publisher: Harper and Row
- Publication date: 1973
- Publication place: United States

Mars and the Mind of Man is a non-fiction book chronicling a public symposium at the California Institute of Technology on November 12, 1971. The panel consisted of five luminaries of science, literature, and journalism: Ray Bradbury; Arthur C. Clarke; Bruce C. Murray; Carl Sagan and Walter Sullivan. These five are the authors of this book. The symposium occurred shortly before the Mariner 9 space probe entered orbit around Mars. The book was published in 1973 by Harper and Row of New York.

== About the book ==
The book is record of the November 1971 discussion undertaken by the five distinguished panel members mentioned above. This conversation earmarked Mariner 9's Martian arrival as an important moment. Also, the symposium hailed a remarkable milestone. Mariner 9 was to be the first earth spacecraft to be inserted into the orbit of another distinct planet. As noted, "...Caltech Planetary Science professor Bruce Murray summoned [the] formidable panel of thinkers to discuss the implications of this historic event." The discussion's moderator was Walter Sullivan, the New York Times science editor. Varied perspectives were offered on the Mariner 9 mission; the red planet itself; the interrelationship of humans and the Cosmos; prioritizing the exploration of space; and contemplating civilization's future. Also included in the book are the first photos sent to Earth by the Mariner 9 space probe and "...a selection of 'afterthoughts' by the panelists, looking back on the historic achievement."

== Bradbury's poem ==
On several minutes of archived footage released by NASA, Bradbury is shown engaging in witty banter with other panel members at the November 1971 panel discussion. The film segment was issued in 2012 to honor a newly named site on the red planet,"Bradbury Landing". Also the released footage shows Bradbury reading his poem "If Only We Had Taller Been" (poem begins at 2:20) At the time, this was "...one of several unpublished poems he shared at the event." Before reading the poem, Bradbury is recorded saying "I don’t know what in the hell I’m doing here. I’m the least scientific of all the people up on the platform here today...I was hoping, that during the last few days, as we got closer to Mars and the dust cleared, that we’d see a lot of Martians standing there with huge signs saying, ‘Bradbury was right,’”
