= Walter Sullivan (journalist) =

American science reporter and author (1918–1996)

Walter Seager Sullivan Jr. (January 12, 1918 – March 19, 1996) was an American journalist. He was considered the "dean" of science writers.

Sullivan spent most of his career as a science reporter for The New York Times. Over a 50-year career, he covered all aspects of science—Antarctic expeditions, rocket launchings in the late 1950s, physics, chemistry and geology.

He wrote several well-received books, including Assault on the Unknown about the International Geophysical Year; We Are Not Alone, a bestseller about the search for extraterrestrial intelligence; Continents in Motion; Black Holes: The Edge of Space, the End of Time; and Landprints.

In 1971, Sullivan participated in a symposium on the occasion of the arrival of Mariner 9 to Mars, together with Ray Bradbury, Arthur C. Clarke, Carl Sagan and Bruce C. Murray. Their discussions were recorded in the book Mars and the Mind of Man.

Sullivan won nearly every award open to a science journalist, including the Daly Medal of the American Geographical Society, the George Polk Award, the Distinguished Public Service Award of the National Science Foundation, the AIP Science writing award; the James T. Grady-James H. Stack Award for Interpreting Chemistry for the Public from the American Chemical Society, and the American Association for the Advancement of Science.

In 1980, Sullivan was awarded the Public Welfare Medal from the National Academy of Sciences.

The American Geophysical Union named its science journalism award after Sullivan.

== See also ==
- Gerard K. O'Neill
