= Larry Soderblom =

American geophysicist (born 1944)

Laurence A. Soderblom
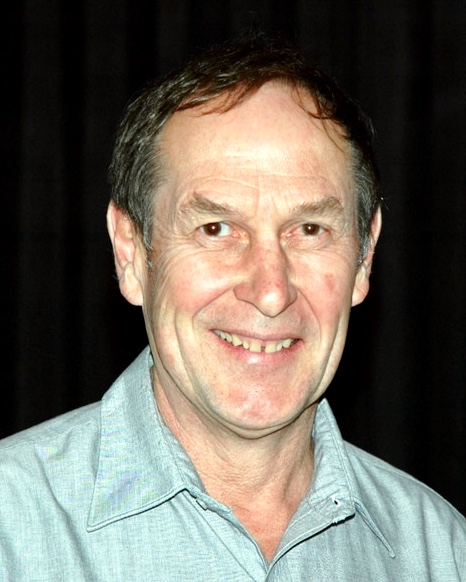
- Born: 1944 (age 81–82)
- Education: New Mexico Institute of Mining and Technology
- Alma mater: Caltech
- Awards: 2014 Whipple Award
- Scientific career
- Fields: Planetary science, geophysics
- Workplaces: USGS Astrogeology Science Center; JPL
- Thesis: The Distribution and Ages of Regional Lithologies in the Lunar Maria (1970)
- Academic advisors: Bruce C. Murray and Eugene Merle Shoemaker

Laurence Albert Soderblom (born 1944) is an American geophysicist with the Astrogeology Science center at the United States Geological Survey in Flagstaff, Arizona, where he has served as Chief of the Branch of Astrogeology. Soderblom is best known for his work in imaging science.

He earned Bachelor of Science degrees in geology and physics from the New Mexico Institute of Mining and Technology and a PhD in planetary science and geophysics from Caltech.

Soderblom has been involved in several JPL planetary missions. As an Associate Investigator on the Mariner 6, 7, and Mariner 9, and Viking program teams. He is best known for his leadership in imaging science on the Voyager, Magellan, Galileo, Mars Global Surveyor, Mars Pathfinder, and Mars Exploration Rovers. He also served on the science teams of the Deep Space 1 and Cassini–Huygens missions. He has participated in missions ranging from Venus to Neptune and each of the planets in between.

Soderblom has also appeared on Cosmos: A Personal Voyage and The Planets (1999) discussing his work with the Voyager team.

== Honors and awards ==
- During 1983-84 he was a Sherman Fairchild Distinguished Scholar at Caltech.
- 2014 Whipple Award for outstanding contribution to planetary science
