= Bruce C. Murray =

American geologist and planetary scientist (1931–2013)

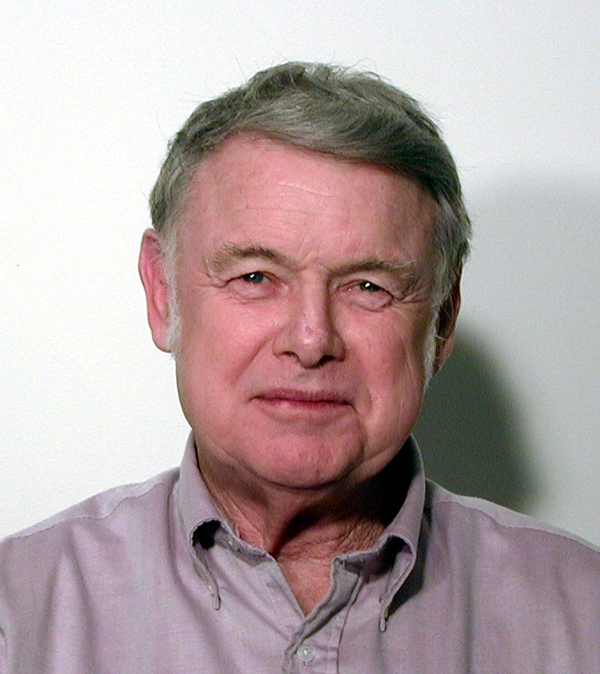
- Born: November 30, 1931; New York City, New York, U.S.
- Died: August 29, 2013 (aged 81); Oceanside, California, U.S.
- Education: MIT – Ph.D. geology (1955)
- Spouse(s): Joan O'Brien (divorced; 3 children); Suzanne Moss (2 children)
- Relatives: Tom Foley (cousin)
- Awards: Carl Sagan Memorial Award (1997); Whipple Award (1999); Telluride Tech Festival Award
- Scientific career
- Fields: Planetary science; Geology
- Workplaces: Caltech; The Planetary Society; JPL; Standard Oil of California; United States Air Force
- Doctoral students: Larry Soderblom

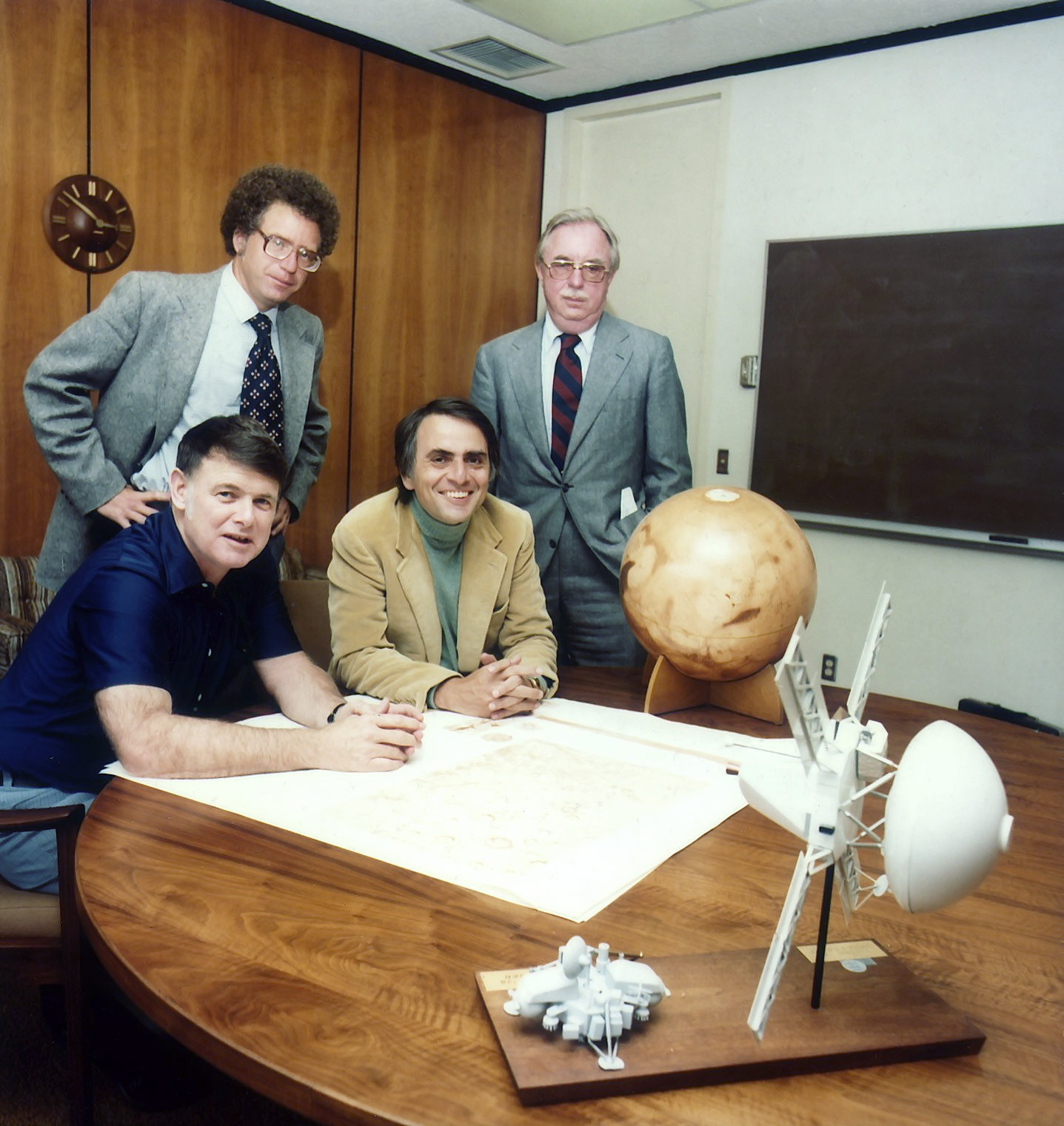
Seated on left with other Planetary Society Founders and enthusiasts in the 1970s.

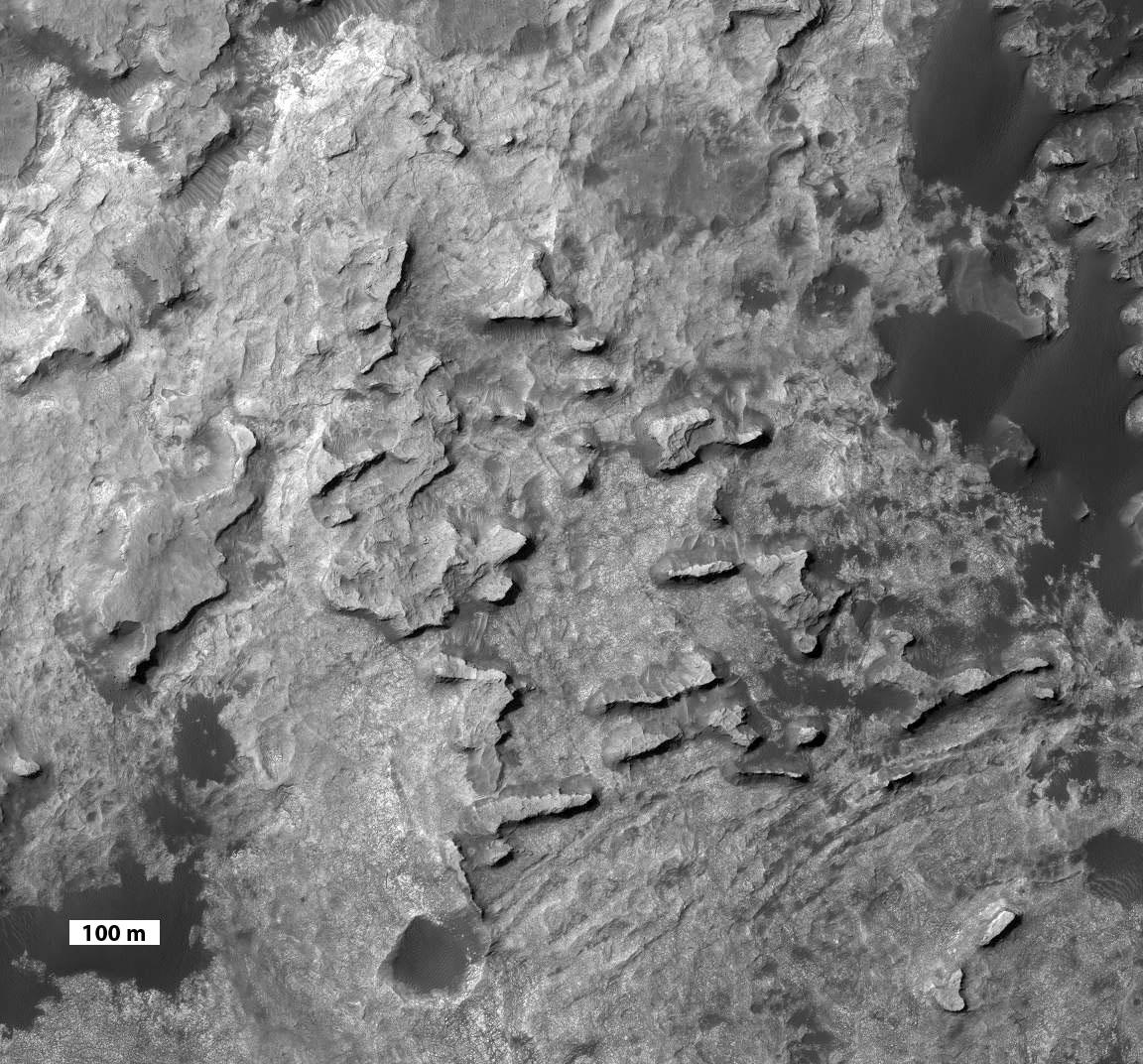
"Murray Buttes" on Mars - steep knobs the Curiosity rover traversed on its way to Mount Sharp (November 13, 2013).

Bruce Churchill Murray (November 30, 1931 – August 29, 2013) was an American planetary scientist. He was a director of the Jet Propulsion Laboratory (JPL) and co-founder of The Planetary Society.

== Education and early life ==
Murray received his Ph.D. in geology from Massachusetts Institute of Technology (MIT) in 1955 and joined Standard Oil of California as a geologist. He served in the United States Air Force as a geophysicist, and the U.S. Civil Service before joining California Institute of Technology (Caltech) in 1960.

== Career ==
At Caltech, Murray became an associate professor in 1963, a full professor in 1969, and a professor emeritus in 2001. He would later become professor emeritus of planetary science and geology.

Murray began working at the Jet Propulsion Laboratory (managed by/affiliated with Caltech) in 1960, and served as its director from April 1, 1976, to June 30, 1982. He was an important force in promoting the recruitment and hiring of female engineers at the lab, where more women are employed today than any other NASA facility. Murray became JPL's director at a time when space exploration budgets were shrinking; among other achievements, he saved the Galileo mission to Jupiter from the budget axe.

Murray worked out the geologic history of Mars using photographs taken by Mariner 4 in 1965; he worked with Bob Leighton to accomplish this task. He applied similar photographic analysis when he served as chief scientist of Mariner 10. As he took over management of JPL, he expressed reservations about the Viking lander program, pointing out that the biological experiments included with the spacecraft were not sufficient to accomplish their stated goals.

In 1971, he participated in a symposium on the occasion of the arrival of Mariner 9 to Mars, together with Ray Bradbury, Arthur C. Clarke, Carl Sagan, and Walter Sullivan. Their discussions were recorded in the book Mars and the Mind of Man.

With Carl Sagan and Louis Friedman, Murray founded The Planetary Society in 1980. He also served a term as its chair.

== Personal life and death ==
Murray was twice married. With his first wife, Joan O'Brien, he had three children. Murray and O'Brien divorced in 1970. In 1971, Murray married Suzanne Murray, with whom he had two children.

One of Murray's cousins is former Speaker of the House Tom Foley.

Murray died at his home in Oceanside, California on August 29, 2013, from complications of Alzheimer's disease, aged 81.

== Awards and honors ==
Murray was the recipient of the 1997 Carl Sagan Memorial Award.

In 2004, Murray was awarded the Telluride Tech Festival Award of Technology in Telluride, Colorado.

Asteroid 4957 Brucemurray is named after him, and the asteroid 2392 Jonathan Murray is named after his son.

On November 13, 2013, NASA announced the names of two features on Mars important to two active Mars exploration rovers in honor of Murray: "Murray Ridge", an uplifted crater that the Opportunity rover was exploring; and "Murray Buttes", an entryway the Curiosity rover had to traverse on its way to Mount Sharp.

Academic offices
Preceded by William Hayward Pickering	5th Director of the Jet Propulsion Laboratory; 1976 – 1982	Succeeded by Lew Allen, Jr.
