= Louis Friedman =

American astronautics engineer and space spokesperson

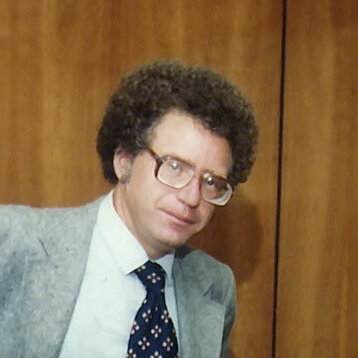
- Friedman in the 1970s
- Born: Louis Dill Friedman; July 7, 1941 (age 83); Kingston, New York, U.S.
- Education: University of Wisconsin, Madison (BS); Cornell University (MS); Massachusetts Institute of Technology (PhD)
- Scientific career
- Fields: astronautics, engineering
- Institutions: AVCO, The Planetary Society, Jet Propulsion Laboratory
- Thesis: Extracting Scientific Information from Spacecraft Tracking Data (1971)

Louis Dill Friedman (born July 7, 1941) is an American astronautics engineer and space spokesperson. He was born in New York and raised in the Bronx. Dr. Friedman was a co-founder of The Planetary Society with Carl Sagan and Bruce C. Murray.

== Education and career ==
In 1961, he earned his Bachelor of Science in applied mathematics and engineering physics at the University of Wisconsin, Madison. In 1963, he graduated at Cornell University with a Masters of Science in engineering mechanics. In 1971, he graduated with a Ph.D. from the Department of Aeronautics and Astronautics at the Massachusetts Institute of Technology with a thesis entitled, Extracting Scientific Information from Spacecraft Tracking Data.

He worked for AVCO Space Systems Division from 1963 to 1968. From 1970 through 1980, he was with the Jet Propulsion Laboratory (JPL) leading the Advanced Planetary Studies and the post-Viking Mars Program. Other projects at the JPL include Mariner-Venus-Mercury, Planetary Grand Tour (Voyager), Venus Orbital Imaging Radar (Magellan probe), Halley's Comet Rendezvous-Solar Sail, and the Mars Program.

== Projects, Print, and Speeches ==
- Human spaceflight : from Mars to the stars. Univ. of Arizona Press, Tucson 2015, ISBN 978-0-8165-3146-2.
- Star Sailing: Solar Sails and Interstellar Flight, Louis Friedman, John Wiley & Sons Inc., 1988, ISBN 978-0-471-62593-3, 146 pgs.
- Project Director of the Solar Sail mission by The Planetary Society and Cosmos Studies: Cosmos I
- Part of the technical team on the Mars Balloon and Mars Rover for The Planetary Society
- Asked to participate in both Congressional and Administrative reviews for American and Russian space missions
- 2004 Congressional Hearings on Space: United States Senate Committee on Commerce, Science and Transportation – NASA Future Space Mission
- ”Think Bigger About Mars” Louis Friedman, June 27, 2000
- ”A Space Nerd Responds” Louis Friedman, August 13, 2007
- ”Where will the Next 50 Years in Space Take Us? Expert Opinions” Popular Mechanics, September 2007

== Associations ==
- The Planetary Society – Executive Director and author of World Watch in the Planetary Report
- Sigma Xi
- American Astronautical Society
- Fellow of the American Association for the Advancement of Science
- American Institute of Aeronautics and Astronautics – Congressional Fellow 1978-79
