= The Planetary Society =

US-based non-governmental organization

- Formation: 1980; 46 years ago
- Type: Non-governmental and nonprofit foundation, 501(c)(3)
- Tax ID no.: 95-3423566
- Registration no.: C0946337
- Location: Pasadena, California, US
- Fields: Space advocacy
- Members: 40,000
- Key people: Louis Friedman, Bill Nye, Neil deGrasse Tyson, Carl Sagan, Bruce C. Murray
- Website: www.planetary.org

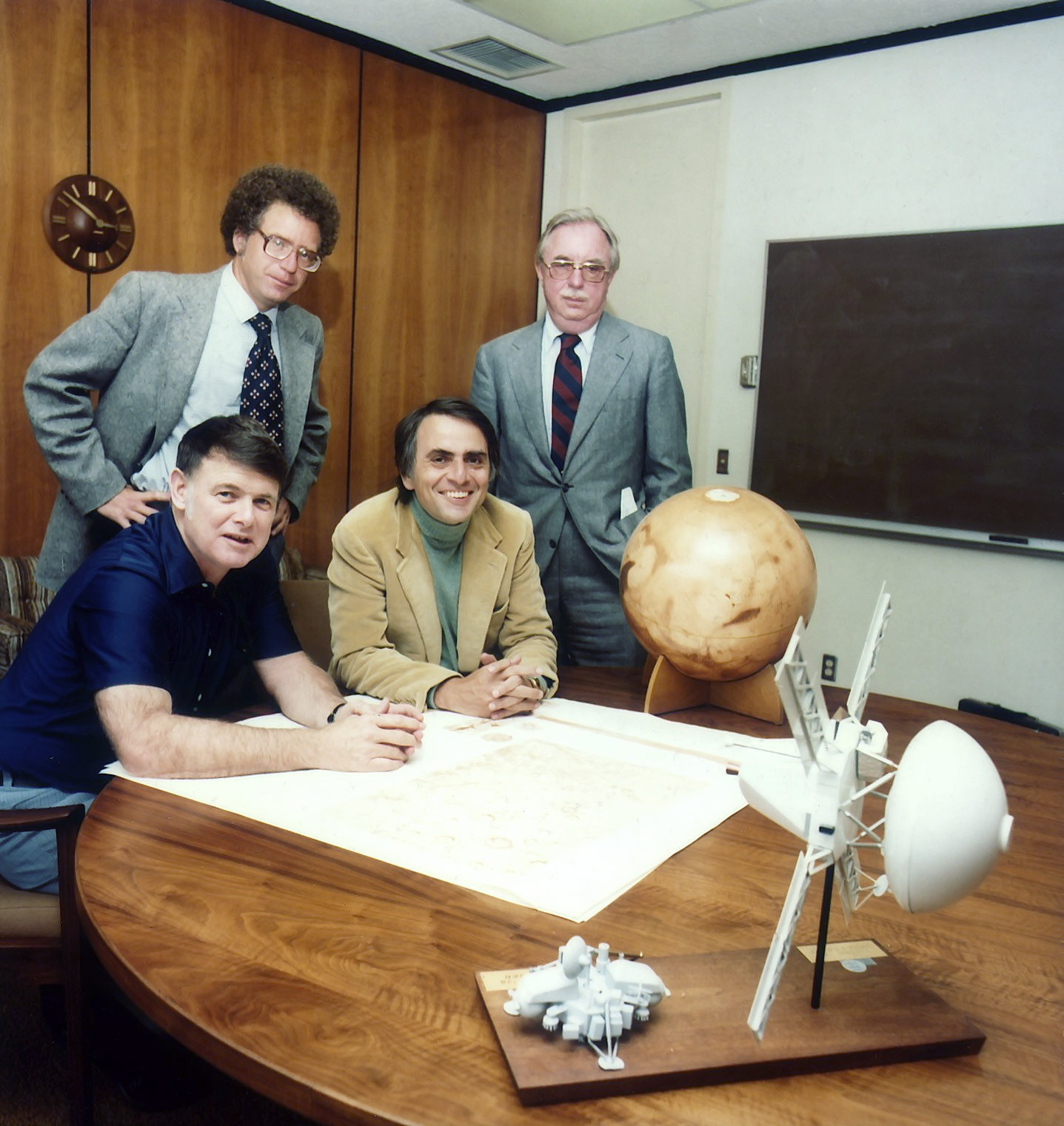
Planetary Society founders (1980 photo). Clockwise from bottom left: Bruce Murray; Louis Friedman; Harry Ashmore (advisor); Carl Sagan

The Planetary Society is an American internationally-active non-governmental nonprofit organization. It is involved in research, public outreach, and political space advocacy for projects related to astronomy, planetary science, and space exploration. It was founded in 1980 by Carl Sagan, Bruce Murray, and Louis Friedman. It is currently led by Jennifer Vaughn as CEO, with Bill Nye as Chief Ambassador and Vice Chairman. The Planetary Society encompasses a community of over 2 million space enthusiasts and 40,000 members from more than 80 countries around the world. It is largely funded by individual donations.

The society is dedicated to the scientific exploration of the Solar System, the search for extraterrestrial life, and defending Earth from potentially hazardous near-Earth objects. The society’s mission is stated as: "Empowering the world’s citizens to advance space science and exploration." The Planetary Society is a strong advocate for space funding and missions of exploration, particularly within NASA. They engage Congress and encourage residents of the United States to speak up in support of NASA, with annual in-person advocacy at their Day of Action in Washington, D.C. The Planetary Society has organized campaigns that have been credited with helping prevent the cancellation of the New Horizons mission to Pluto and the VERITAS mission to Venus. It has also organized major efforts in support of the Europa Clipper and NEO Surveyor missions.

In addition to advocacy, The Planetary Society sponsors science and technology projects related to the search for life, planetary exploration, and asteroid defense. It has supported several major SETI surveys to look for signs of extraterrestrial intelligence, including a collaboration with Steven Spielberg that financed the most advanced SETI survey at the time. In 2011, a microgravity experiment built by The Planetary Society was tested aboard the Space Shuttle Endeavour, and in 2015, The Society crowdfunded a pair of spacecraft to demonstrate solar sailing technology. The first, LightSail 1, launched on May 20, 2015, and performed a test deployment of its solar sail on June 7, 2015. LightSail 2 launched on June 25, 2019, and successfully used sunlight to change its orbit.

To promote public engagement with space science and exploration, The Planetary Society also regularly produces articles, videos, the Planetary Radio podcast, children’s books, and educational programming. It publishes a quarterly magazine, The Planetary Report, and hosts in-person events around the world. As of 2025, The Planetary Society’s social media channels have been nominated for two Webby awards.

== History ==
The Planetary Society was founded in 1980 by Carl Sagan, Bruce Murray, and Louis Friedman as a champion of public support of space exploration and the search for extraterrestrial life. Until the death of Sagan in 1996, the society was co-led by Sagan, who used his celebrity and political clout to influence the political climate of the time, including protecting SETI from congressional cancellation in 1981. Throughout the 1980s and 1990s, the society pushed its scientific and technological agenda, which led to an increased interest in rover-based planetary exploration and NASA’s New Horizons mission to Pluto. The principal investigator of New Horizons, Alan Stern, has credited The Planetary Society with having helped prevent the mission from being cancelled at multiple points during its development.

In the 1990s, The Planetary Society began advocating for a mission to explore Jupiter’s moon Europa and assess its potential to host life. This mission would eventually be officially developed as NASA’s Europa Clipper. In 2013, when the United States Congress was considering cancelling the mission, The Planetary Society launched a multi-year advocacy campaign and met frequently with Congressman John Culberson, then chair of the House Subcommittee on Commerce, Justice, Science, and Related Agencies. As part of this advocacy campaign, Society members sent over 380,000 letters to their political representatives in support of Europa Clipper. In addition to its advocacy efforts, the society has created and sponsored a number of space-related science and technology projects. In 1981, The Planetary Society partnered with NASA to fund Suitcase SETI, a project which eventually grew into Sentinel, the first dedicated high-resolution survey to search for extraterrestrial intelligence. Since then, the society has supported several other SETI surveys. In the 1990s, it began expanding assistance to a wider variety of scientific projects, including a network of amateur astronomers dedicated to the study of potentially hazardous near-Earth objects. In the 2010s, the Society crowdfunded and built a pair of spacecraft dedicated to testing solar sailing technology. Society members also helped fund the development of Honeybee Robotics’ PlanetVac instrument, which landed on the Moon as part of Firefly Aerospace’s Blue Ghost Mission 1 on March 2, 2025. In the 2020s, the society announced the creation of a regular grant program to support space-related research projects.

On April 11, 2025, The Planetary Society launched its "Save NASA Science" advocacy campaign in response to the White House Office of Management and Budget’s proposal to cut NASA’s science funding by 47% for the 2026 fiscal year, with the society stating the cuts were "unprecedented, unstrategic, and wasteful." On July 30, 2025, The Planetary Society and several other scientific advocacy organizations announced a joint Day of Action on October 5 and October 6 in Washington, D.C. The event took place on October 6, 2025, with CEO Bill Nye and over 300 supporters from across its allied organizations gathering on the steps of the U.S. Capitol to urge Congress to reject the proposed funding cuts. The campaign, which grew into the largest advocacy event in the society’s history, ultimately succeeded when Congress passed a final budget in early 2026 that restored full funding for NASA’s science directorate, averting the proposed cuts.

== Organization ==
The Planetary Society membership structure follows a centralized, Board-directed, staff-managed model. Rather than being organized as regional chapters, members in the US and around the world may interact with each other and the organization through its active online member community. Membership is offered at tiered levels and may be maintained on either an annual or recurring monthly basis.

The Planetary Society is currently governed by a 12-member volunteer Board of Directors chosen for their passion about and knowledge of space exploration. The Board has a Chair, President, Vice President, Treasurer, and Secretary, and normally meets twice per year to set the society’s policies and future directions. Nominations are sought and considered periodically from a variety of sources, including from members of the Board and Advisory Council, Society Members, staff, and experts in the space community. On June 7, 2010, the society announced that American science educator Bill Nye would become the new executive director of the society.

== Board of directors ==
The Planetary Society’s current board of directors consists of:

- Jennifer Vaughn, chief executive officer
- Bill Nye, chief ambassador and vice chairman of the board
- Daniel Geraci, chairman of the board
- Bethany Ehlmann, president and member of executive committee
- Heidi Hammel, vice president and member of executive committee
- Lon Levin, treasurer of the board and member of executive committee
- Jim Bell, secretary and member of executive committee
- John Grunsfeld
- Dipak Srinivasan
- Britney Schmidt
- Bijal (Bee) Thakore
- Newton Campbell Jr.
- Robert Picardo
- Lorne Trottier

The advisory council consists of: Neil deGrasse Tyson, Sirisha Bandla, David Brin, Nagin Cox, G. Scott Hubbard, Gary E. Hunt, Mark Hunter, Ryan Johnson, Ryan Kriser, Rosaly Lopes, Brian Murphy, Brian Pope, Pete Slosberg, and Kevin Stube.

A number of major public figures have served on the board or advisory council of The Planetary Society in the past, including astronauts Sally Ride and Michael Collins; authors Arthur C. Clarke, Ray Bradbury, Stephen Jay Gould, and Isaac Asimov; Hollywood stars Paul Newman, Steven Spielberg, and John Rhys-Davies; Nobel Prize winner Harold Urey; senators Harrison Schmitt and Adlai Stevenson III; former Secretary of Education Shirley Hufstedler; and astronomers Neil Degrasse Tyson, James Van Allen, and Frank Drake.

Additionally, The Planetary Society has been endorsed by James Cameron, Brian May, Seth MacFarlane, Gene Roddenberry, and a variety of actors famed for their roles in Star Trek.

== Science and technology ==
The Planetary Society sponsors science and technology projects to seed further exploration. All of these projects are funded by the society’s members and donors. Some projects include:

=== LightSail ===
In 2015, The Planetary Society launched a crowdfunding campaign to finance two solar sailing space missions. The first mission, LightSail 1, launched on May 20, 2015, and demonstrated a test deployment of its solar sail. The second mission, LightSail 2, launched on June 25, 2019, and successfully used sunlight to change its orbit. The mission was recognized as one of TIME’s 100 Best Inventions of 2019 and also won an award from Popular Science. The Planetary Society published data from the flights in a number of scientific papers. Its chief scientist, Bruce Betts, has since consulted with NASA teams working on their own solar sail missions.

=== SETI ===
The Planetary Society has supported several different projects related to the search for extraterrestrial intelligence. In 1981, the society partnered with NASA to fund Suitcase SETI, an instrument which eventually grew into the first dedicated high-resolution SETI survey. Four years later, the society collaborated with Steven Spielberg to help finance the Megachannel ExtraTerrestrial Array (META), the most advanced SETI search at the time. Subsequent Society-sponsored SETI projects included the META II and SERENDIP radio surveys, the first dedicated all-sky optical SETI survey, the "Are we alone in the universe?" citizen science project, and the SETI@home initiative to process SERENDIP data using a volunteer network of personal computers.

=== STEP grants ===
In 2021, The Planetary Society established its Science and Technology Empowering the Public (STEP) Grants as a means of providing dedicated support to projects related to the search for life, planetary exploration, and planetary defense. The society regularly holds open calls for STEP Grant proposals and has awarded nearly $200,000 to four different projects so far. Grant winners have included an asteroid research program at the University of Belgrade, a space agriculture program at the University of Florida, a citizen science SETI project based out of the University of California, Los Angeles, and an astrobiology project at Dartmouth College related to saline marine environments on other worlds.

=== Shoemaker NEO grants ===
In 1997, The Planetary Society founded the Shoemaker NEO Grant program to support a global network of amateur astronomers dedicated to finding, tracking, and studying potentially dangerous near-Earth objects. Awardees receive funds to upgrade their equipment so they can better observe their targets. More than 50 astronomers in over 20 different countries have received grants since the program’s founding, with over $500,000 awarded to date. As of 2025, Shoemaker grants have helped amateur astronomers discover nearly 500 NEOs and perform observations of over 19,000 others. One recent grant winner, Leonardo Amaral, discovered a rare kilometer-sized asteroid in 2020. This asteroid, 2020 QU6, is large enough to cause global devastation if it ever hit Earth, though no impact is anticipated based on its current orbital trajectory.

=== PlanetVac ===
In 2013, The Planetary Society helped fund a prototype and laboratory test of Honeybee Robotics’ PlanetVac instrument, a technology designed to perform reliable, low-cost sample collection on other worlds. Five years later, Society members helped fund another test of PlanetVac, this time on a live rocket. The test was a success and increased PlanetVac’s technology readiness level.

In 2025, a version of PlanetVac landed and operated on the Moon as part of Firefly Aerospace’s Blue Ghost Mission 1. Another version, called "P Sampler", will collect samples as part of JAXA’s Martian Moons eXploration (MMX) mission to bring back material from Phobos, scheduled to launch in 2026.

The society has also funded research into the Pioneer anomaly, exoplanet detection, panspermia, asteroid deflection, the Chicxulub impact, and Mars rovers and drills.

== Public outreach and education ==
The Planetary Society produces articles, videos, children’s books, podcasts, and other educational programming to promote public engagement with space science and exploration. It has published a quarterly magazine, The Planetary Report, since its founding in 1980. Space science and policy experts at the Planetary Society are regularly interviewed by media outlets and also contribute op-eds to publications such as The New York Times and SpaceNews.

=== Names and messages with spacecraft ===
As part of their mission to connect individuals with space exploration, the Planetary Society has helped members of the public send names and other messages aboard a number of different spacecraft. It has also helped organize public contests to name space missions and Solar System objects themselves.

Missions that have carried names and messages include: the Spirit and Opportunity rovers, New Horizons, OSIRIS-REx, Cassini-Huygens, Mars Pathfinder, Phoenix, Dawn, Deep Impact, MAVEN, Hayabusa2, IKAROS, Akatsuki, Glory, Lunar Reconnaissance Orbiter, Kaguya (SELENE), LightSail 2, Cosmos 1, Hayabusa, and Stardust. Some of these missions, like LightSail 2, were built by The Planetary Society. In other cases, The Society worked with other groups to collect and send the messages.

The minor planets Bonestell, Nereus, and Braille were all named through contests co-organized by The Planetary Society. So was Bennu, the target asteroid of NASA’s OSIRIS-REx sample return mission. In partnership with the LEGO Group, the Planetary Society ran the naming contest for the Mars Exploration Rovers, from which NASA selected Spirit and Opportunity.

=== Planetary Report ===
The Planetary Report is the quarterly internationally recognized flagship magazine of the Planetary Society, featuring articles and that provide comprehensive coverage of discoveries about the worlds of our Solar System and beyond. This magazine reaches 40,000 members of The Planetary Society all over the world, with news about planetary missions, spacefaring nations, space explorers, and the latest findings in humankind’s exploration of the Solar System.

=== Planetary Radio ===
In 2002, the Planetary Society inaugurated a weekly radio program and podcast, Planetary Radio, hosted and produced by science communicator and radio reporter Mat Kaplan. Planetary Radio episodes typically feature conversations and visits with astronomers, planetary scientists, engineers, space mission project managers, astronauts, artists, writers, advocates, and others who can provide insight into the current state of space science and exploration. The program also covers major space news events, such as launches and advocacy updates. In 2023, Sarah Al-Ahmed became the new host and producer of Planetary Radio.

The society also releases monthly episodes of Planetary Radio: Space Policy Edition, which features interviews between The Planetary Society’s Chief of Space Policy, Casey Dreier, and guests with a background in space policy and politics.

== See also ==
- List of astronomical societies
- Neil deGrasse Tyson
- SETI Institute
- Cosmos: A Personal Voyage
